= Unit Gompertz distribution =

Continuous probability distribution

unit-Gompertz Distribution
- Probability density function

- Cumulative distribution function
- Parameters: $\alpha > 0\,$ (real) $\beta > 0\,$ (real)
- Support: $x \in (0,1)\,$
- PDF: $\alpha \beta x^{-(\beta+1)} \exp \left[ -\alpha \left( x^{-\beta} - 1 \right) \right]$
- CDF: $\exp \left[ -\alpha \left( x^{-\beta} - 1 \right) \right]$
- Quantile: $\exp \left[ -\frac{1}{\beta} \log(\alpha - \log p) - \log \alpha \right]$
- Mean: $\alpha^{\frac{1}{\beta}} e^\alpha \Gamma \left( 1 - \frac{1}{\beta}, \alpha \right)$
- Mode: $x_0 = \left( \frac{\alpha \beta}{\beta + 1} \right)^{\frac{1}{\beta}}$
- Variance: $\alpha^{\frac{2}{\beta}} e^{2\alpha} \left\{ \Gamma \left( 1 - \frac{2}{\beta}, \alpha \right) - \left[ \Gamma \left( 1 - \frac{1}{\beta}, \alpha \right) \right]^2 \right\}$
- Skewness: $\frac{\mu'_3 - 3\mu'_2\mu + \mu^3}{\sigma^3}$
- Excess kurtosis: $\frac{\mu'_4 - 4\mu'_3\mu + 6\mu'_2\mu^2 - 3\mu^4}{\sigma^4}$
- MGF: $\alpha^{\frac{r}{\beta}} e^\alpha \Gamma \left( 1 - \frac{r}{\beta}, \alpha \right)$

The unit-Gompertz distribution (UGo) is a continuous probability distribution with domain on $(0,1)$. Useful for bounded variables with a $(0,1)$ domain. It was originally proposed by Mazucheli et al using a transformation of the Gompertz distribution. It is a suitable alternative for fitting skewed data. A quantile regression model has also been derived from the distribution.

== Definitions ==
=== Probability density function ===
Its probability density function is defined as:

$$f(x \mid \alpha, \beta) = \alpha \beta x^{-(\beta+1)} \exp \left[ -\alpha \left( x^{-\beta} - 1 \right) \right].$$

=== Cumulative distribution function ===
And its cumulative distribution function is:

$$F(x \mid \alpha, \beta) = \exp \left[ -\alpha \left( x^{-\beta} - 1 \right) \right].$$

=== Quantile function ===
The quantile function of the UGo distribution is given by:

$$Q(p \mid \alpha, \beta) = \exp \left[ -\frac{1}{\beta} \log(\alpha - \log p) - \log \alpha \right].$$

== Properties ==
=== Moments ===
The $r$th raw moment of the UGo distribution can be obtained through:

$$\mu'_r = \mathbb{E}(X^r) = \int_0^1 x^r \alpha \beta x^{-(\beta+1)} \exp \left[ -\alpha \left( x^{-\beta} - 1 \right) \right] dx = \alpha^{\frac{r}{\beta}} e^\alpha \Gamma \left( 1 - \frac{r}{\beta}, \alpha \right),$$

where $\Gamma(\cdot, \cdot)$ is the upper incomplete gamma function. The moments exists only when $\frac{r}{\beta} < 1$.

=== Skewness and kurtosis ===
The skewness and kurtosis measures can be obtained upon substituting the raw moments from the expressions:

$$\mathit{skewness} = \frac{\mu'_3 - 3\mu'_2 \mu + \mu^3}{\sigma^3},
\mathit{kurtosis} = \frac{\mu'_4 - 4\mu'_3 \mu + 6\mu'_2 \mu^2 - 3\mu^4}{\sigma^4}$$

=== Hazard rate ===
The hazard rate function of the UGo distribution is given by:

$$h(x \mid \alpha, \beta) = \frac{\alpha \beta x^{-(\beta+1)} \exp \left[ -\alpha \left( x^{-\beta} - 1 \right) \right]}{1 - \exp \left[ -\alpha \left( x^{-\beta} - 1 \right) \right]},
\quad 0 < x < 1.$$

== Parameter estimation ==
Let $\mathbf{x} = (x_1, \ldots, x_n)$ be a random sample of size $n$ from the UGo distribution with probability density function defined before. Then, the log-likelihood function of $\boldsymbol{\theta} = (\alpha, \beta)$ is:

$$\begin{align}
\ell(\mathbf{x} \mid \boldsymbol{\theta}) = n \log \alpha + n \log \beta - (\beta + 1) \sum_{i=1}^n \log x_i - \alpha \sum_{i=1}^n x_i^{-\beta} + n \alpha.
\end{align}$$

The likelihood estimate $\hat{\boldsymbol{\theta}}$ of $\boldsymbol{\theta}$ is obtained by solving the non-linear equations

$$\frac{\partial \ell}{\partial \alpha} = n \left( 1 + \frac{1}{\alpha} \right) - \sum_{i=1}^n x_i^{-\beta},$$

and

$$\frac{\partial \ell}{\partial \beta} = \frac{n}{\beta} + \alpha \sum_{i=1}^n \frac{\log x_i}{x_i^\beta} - \sum_{i=1}^n \log x_i.$$

The Hessian matrix of the log-likelihood with respect to the unknown parameters is given by

$$\mathbf{H} = \begin{bmatrix}
-\dfrac{n}{\alpha^2} & \vdots & \displaystyle\sum_{i=1}^n \frac{\log x_i}{x_i^\beta} \\
\cdots\cdots\cdots\cdots & \cdot & \cdots\cdots\cdots\cdots\cdots\cdots \\
\displaystyle\sum_{i=1}^n \frac{\log x_i}{x_i^\beta} & \vdots & -\alpha \displaystyle\sum_{i=1}^n \frac{(\log x_i)^2}{x_i^\beta} + \frac{n}{\beta^2}
\end{bmatrix}$$

The expected Fisher information matrix of $\boldsymbol{\theta} = (\alpha, \beta)$ based on a single observation is given by

$$\mathbf{I}(\boldsymbol{\theta}) = n \begin{bmatrix}
\dfrac{1}{\alpha^2} & \vdots & \dfrac{e^\alpha E_1(\alpha) + 1}{\beta \alpha} \\
\cdots\cdots\cdots\cdots\cdots & \cdot & \cdots\cdots\cdots\cdots\cdots\cdots \\
\dfrac{e^\alpha E_1(\alpha) + 1}{\beta \alpha} & \vdots & \alpha^2 \beta I_{22} + \dfrac{1}{\beta^2}
\end{bmatrix},$$

where $E_n(\cdot)$ represents the exponential integral function defined as

$$E_k(x) = \int_1^\infty \frac{\mathrm{e}^{-xt}}{t^k} \, dt = x^{k-1} \Gamma(1-k, x),$$

and

$$I_{22} = \int_0^1 \left[ \frac{(\log x)^2}{x^\beta} \right] x^{-(\beta+1)} \exp \left[ -\alpha \left( x^{-\beta} - 1 \right) \right] dx.$$

== Applications ==
It was shown to outperform, against other distributions, like the beta and Kumaraswamy distributions, in: maximum flood level, literacy rates, and stress-strength reliability estimation data.

== See also ==
- Gompertz distribution
