= List of things named after Pierre-Simon Laplace =

This is a list of things named after Pierre-Simon Laplace

== Probability theory ==
- de Moivre-Laplace theorem that approximates binomial distribution with a normal distribution
- Laplace–Bayes estimator
- Laplace distribution
  - Laplace–Gauss distribution
  - Asymmetric Laplace distribution
  - Log-Laplace distribution
  - Multivariate Laplace distribution
  - Wrapped asymmetric Laplace distribution
- Laplace functional
- Laplace motion
- Laplace's rule of succession
- Laplace smoothing

== Mathematical analysis ==
- Laplace principle (large deviations theory)
- Laplace series
- Laplace transform
  - Two-sided Laplace transform
  - Laplace–Carson transform
  - Laplace–Stieltjes transform
  - Inverse Laplace transform
- Laplace's method for approximating integrals
- Laplace limit, concerning series solutions to Kepler's equation
- Laplacian vector field

=== Differential equations ===
- Laplace's equation
  - Laplace operator
    - Discrete Laplace operator
    - Laplace–Beltrami operator
- Laplacian, see Laplace operator
  - Infinity Laplacian
  - p-Laplacian
  - Laplace operators in differential geometry
- Young–Laplace equation
- Laplace invariant

=== Spherical harmonics ===
- Laplace series (Fourier–Laplace series)
- Laplace expansion (potential)
- Laplace coefficient: see Laplace expansion (potential)

== Algebra ==
- Laplace expansion of determinants of matrices

== Discrete mathematics ==
- Laplace matrices in graph theory

== Physics ==
- Laplace's demon
- Laplace equation for irrotational flow
- Laplace force
- Laplace number
- Laplace plane
  - Laplace's invariable plane
- Laplace pressure
- Laplace-Runge-Lenz vector
- Laplace resonance
- Laplace's tidal equations

== Computer science ==
- Harris–Laplace detector
- Laplace mechanism
- Laplacian smoothing

== Others ==
- The asteroid 4628 Laplace is named for Laplace.
- A spur of the Montes Jura on the moon is known as Promontorium Laplace.
- The tentative working name of the European Space Agency Europa Jupiter System Mission is the "Laplace" space probe.
- French submarine Laplace
- LaplacesDemon is Bayesian software
- Institut Pierre Simon Laplace

=== In popular culture ===
- Laplace no Ma, a video game about Laplace's demon
- In Kamen Rider Fourze the Libra Horoscopes develops an ability called "The eye of Laplace"
- In Mega Man Star Force 3 Solo gains a wizard named Laplace.
- In Pokémon, the Japanese name of Lapras is Laplace (ラプラス).
- In Goddess of Victory: Nikke, one of the Nikkes in the Matis squad is named Laplace. All three members of Matis are named for famous scientists: Laplace, Maxwell, and Drake.
- The idea of the Laplace Demon has been cited several times in Japanese pop culture:
  - In the Super Robot Wars serial, Elemental Lord of the Wind Cybuster is said to be equipped with the Laplace Demon which can alter the Laws of Probabilities.
  - In Gundam UC, the titular machine, the Gundam Unicorn, has the La+ (Laplus; Laplace) operative system, which is the key to obtain the Box of Laplace—a repository of secret information whose possession could change the course of the world.
  - In Mushoku Tensei, the Demon God who tried to rule the world was called Laplace.
  - In That Time I Got Reincarnated as a Slime, Laplace is a name of one member of The Moderate Harlequin Alliance.
  - In Rascal Does Not Dream of Bunny Girl Senpai, Tomoe Koga is nicknamed "Laplace's Demon".
