= Laplace's law =

Laplace's law or Laplace's rule may refer to several concepts:

- Biot–Savart law, in electromagnetics, describing magnetic field set up by a steady current density
- Young–Laplace equation, in physics, describing pressure difference over an interface in fluid mechanics
- Laplace expansion, in linear algebra, an expression of the determinant of a matrix
- Rule of succession, in probability theory, a smoothing technique accounting for unseen data

== See also ==
- List of things named after Pierre-Simon Laplace
