= Rayleigh mixture distribution =

In probability theory and statistics a Rayleigh mixture distribution is a weighted mixture of multiple probability distributions where the weightings are equal to the weightings of a Rayleigh distribution. Since the probability density function for a (standard) Rayleigh distribution is given by

$$f(x;\sigma) = \frac{x}{\sigma^2} e^{-x^2/2\sigma^2}, \quad x \geq 0,$$

Rayleigh mixture distributions have probability density functions of the form

$$f(x;\sigma,n) = \int_0^{\infty} \frac{re^{-r^2/2\sigma^2}}{\sigma^2} \tau(x,r;n) \,\mathrm{d}r,$$

where $\tau(x,r;n)$ is a well-defined probability density function or sampling distribution.

The Rayleigh mixture distribution is one of many types of compound distributions in which the appearance of a value in a sample or population might be interpreted as a function of other underlying random variables. Mixture distributions are often used in mixture models, which are used to express probabilities of sub-populations within a larger population.

== See also ==
- Mixture distribution
- List of probability distributions
