= Modified Kumaraswamy distribution =

Continuous probability distribution

Modified Kumaraswamy
- Probability density function

- Cumulative distribution function
- Parameters: $\alpha >0\,$ (real) $\beta >0\,$ (real)
- Support: $x \in (0,1)\,$
- PDF: $\frac{\alpha \beta \mathrm{e}^{\alpha - \alpha/x} (1-\mathrm{e}^{\alpha - \alpha/x })^{\beta-1}}{x^2}$
- CDF: $1-(1-\mathrm{e}^{\alpha - \alpha/x })^\beta$
- Quantile: $\frac{\alpha}{\alpha - \log(1- (1- u)^{1/\beta})}$
- Mean: $$\alpha \beta \mathrm{e}^\alpha \sum_{i=0}^{\infty} (-1)^i \begin{pmatrix} \beta -1 \\ i \end{pmatrix} \mathrm{e}^{\alpha i} \Gamma \left[ 0, \left( i+1 \right) \alpha \right]$$
- Variance: $$\alpha^2 \beta e^\alpha \sum_{i=0}^{\infty} (-1)^i \begin{pmatrix} \beta -1 \\ i \end{pmatrix} \mathrm{e}^{\alpha i}(i+1) \Gamma \left[ -1, \left( i+1 \right) \alpha \right] - \mu^2$$
- MGF: $$\alpha \beta e^\alpha \sum_{i=0}^{\infty} (-1)^i \begin{pmatrix} \beta -1 \\ i \end{pmatrix} \mathrm{e}^{\alpha i}(\alpha + \alpha i)^{h-1} \Gamma \left[1-h, \left( i+1 \right) \alpha \right]$$

In probability theory, the Modified Kumaraswamy (MK) distribution is a two-parameter continuous probability distribution defined on the interval (0,1). It serves as an alternative to the beta and Kumaraswamy distributions for modeling double-bounded random variables. The MK distribution was originally proposed by Sagrillo, Guerra, and Bayer through a transformation of the Kumaraswamy distribution. Its density exhibits an increasing-decreasing-increasing shape, which is not characteristic of the beta or Kumaraswamy distributions. The motivation for this proposal stemmed from applications in hydro-environmental problems.

== Definitions ==
=== Probability density function ===
The probability density function of the Modified Kumaraswamy distribution is

$$f_{X} \left( x;\boldsymbol{\theta} \right) = \frac{\alpha \beta x^{\alpha - \alpha/x} (1-\mathrm{e}^{\alpha - \alpha/x })^{\beta-1}}{x^2}$$

where $\boldsymbol{\theta} = (\alpha, \beta)^\top$ , $\alpha > 0$ and $\beta > 0$ are shape parameters.

=== Cumulative distribution function ===
The cumulative distribution function of Modified Kumaraswamy is given by

$$F_{X} \left( x;\boldsymbol{\theta} \right) = 1-(1-\mathrm{e}^{\alpha - \alpha/x })^\beta$$

where $\boldsymbol{\theta} = (\alpha, \beta)^\top$ , $\alpha > 0$ and $\beta > 0$ are shape parameters.

=== Quantile function ===
The inverse cumulative distribution function (quantile function) is

$$Q_{X} \left( u;\boldsymbol{\theta} \right)  = \frac{\alpha}{\alpha - \log(1- (1- u)^{1/\beta})}$$

== Properties ==
=== Moments ===
The hth statistical moment of X is given by:

$$\textrm{E} \left( X^h \right) = \alpha \beta \mathrm{e}^\alpha \sum_{i=0}^{\infty} (-1)^i
\begin{pmatrix}
\beta -1 \\
i
\end{pmatrix} \mathrm{e}^{\alpha i}(\alpha + \alpha i)^{h-1} \Gamma \left[1-h, \left( i+1 \right) \alpha \right]$$

=== Mean and Variance ===
Measure of central tendency, the mean $( \mu )$ of X is:

$$\mu = \text{E}(X) = \alpha \beta \mathrm{e}^\alpha \sum_{i=0}^{\infty} (-1)^i
\begin{pmatrix}
\beta -1 \\
i
\end{pmatrix} \mathrm{e}^{\alpha i} \Gamma \left[ 0, \left( i+1 \right) \alpha \right]$$

And its variance $( \sigma ^2 )$:

$$\sigma^2 = \text{E}(X^2) = \alpha^2 \beta \mathrm{e}^\alpha \sum_{i=0}^{\infty} (-1)^i
\begin{pmatrix}
\beta -1 \\
i
\end{pmatrix} \mathrm{e}^{\alpha i}(i+1) \Gamma \left[ -1, \left( i+1 \right) \alpha \right] - \mu^2$$

== Parameter estimation ==
Sagrillo, Guerra, and Bayer suggested using the maximum likelihood method for parameter estimation of the MK distribution. The log-likelihood function for the MK distribution, given a sample $x_1,\ldots,x_n$, is:

$$\begin{align}
\ell (\boldsymbol{\theta}) = &\,n\alpha + n\log \left( \alpha \right) + n\log \left( \beta \right) - \alpha \sum_{i=1}^{n} \frac{1}{x_i} -2 \sum_{i=1}^{n} \log (x_i) \\
&+ (\beta - 1) \sum_{i=1}^{n} \log (1-\mathrm{e}^{\alpha - \alpha/x_i}).
\end{align}$$

The components of the score vector $U\left(\boldsymbol{\theta}\right)=\left[\frac{\partial \ell (\boldsymbol{\theta})}{\partial \alpha},\frac{\partial \ell (\boldsymbol{\theta})}{\partial \beta}\right]$ are

$$\begin{align}
\frac{\partial \ell (\boldsymbol{\theta})}{\partial \alpha} = n + \frac{n}{\alpha}
+ (\beta -1) \mathrm{e}^\alpha \sum_{i=1}^{n} \frac{x_i - 1 }{x_i(\mathrm{e}^\alpha-\mathrm{e}^{\alpha/x_i})}
- \sum_{i=1}^{n} \frac{1}{x_i}
\end{align}$$

and

$$\begin{align}
\frac{\partial \ell (\boldsymbol{\theta})}{\partial \beta} = \frac{n}{\beta} + \sum_{i=1}^{n} \log (1-\mathrm{e}^{\alpha-\alpha/x_i})
\end{align}$$

The MLEs of $\boldsymbol{\theta}$, denoted by $\hat{\boldsymbol{\theta}} = \left( \hat{\alpha}, \hat{\beta} \right)^\top$, are obtained as the simultaneous solution of $\boldsymbol{U}(\boldsymbol{\theta}) = \boldsymbol{0}$, where $\boldsymbol{0}$ is a two-dimensional null vector.

== Related distributions ==
- If $X \sim \textrm{MK}(\alpha, \beta)$, then $\left\{ 1- \frac{1}{X} \right\} \sim \textrm{K}(\alpha, \beta)$ (Kumaraswamy distribution)
- If $X \sim \textrm{MK}(\alpha, \beta)$, then $\frac{1}{X} -1 \sim$ Exponentiated exponential (EE) distribution
- If $X \sim \textrm{MK}(1 , \beta)$, then $\exp \left\{ 1- \frac{1}{X} \right\} \sim \textrm{Beta}(1 , \beta)$. (Beta distribution)
- If $X \sim \textrm{MK}(\alpha , 1)$, then $\exp \left\{ 1- \frac{1}{X} \right\} \sim \textrm{Beta}(\alpha , 1)$.
- If $X \sim \textrm{MK}(\alpha , \beta)$, then $\frac{1}{X} -1 \sim \textrm{Exp}(\alpha)$ (Exponential distribution).

== Applications ==
The Modified Kumaraswamy distribution was introduced for modeling hydro-environmental data. It has been shown to outperform the Beta and Kumaraswamy distributions for the useful volume of water reservoirs in Brazil. It was also used in the statistical estimation of the stress-strength reliability of systems.

== See also ==
- Kumaraswamy distribution
