= Chen distribution =

Continuous probability distribution

Chen Distribution
- Probability density function

- Cumulative distribution function
- Parameters: $\lambda >0\,$ (real) $\beta >0\,$ (real)
- Support: $x > 0$
- PDF: $f(x) = a \beta x^{\beta-1} \exp \left\{ x^\beta + a (1 - \mathrm{e}^{x^\beta}) \right\} \cdot \mathbf{1}_{\mathbb{R}_+}(x)$
- CDF: $F(x) = 1 - \mathrm{e}^{\lambda(1 - \mathrm{e}^{x^\beta})}$
- Quantile: $Q(p; a, \beta) = \left[ \ln \left\{ 1 - \ln(1 - p) a^{-1} \right\} \right]^{\beta^{-1}} \cdot \mathbf{1}_{(0,1)}(p)$
- Skewness: $\frac{\mu'_3 - 3\mu'_2 \mu + \mu^3}{\sigma^3}$
- Excess kurtosis: $\frac{\mu'_4 - 4\mu'_3 \mu + 6\mu'_2 \mu^2 - 3\mu^4}{\sigma^4}$
- MGF: $\mathbb{M}_T(s) = a \mathrm{e}^a \int_1^\infty \mathrm{e}^{-s(\ln x)^{\beta^{-1}} - ax} \, \mathrm{d}x$

The Chen Distribution is a continuous probability distribution with domain on $(0,\inf)$. It was originally proposed by Zhenmin Chen as an alternate two-parameter lifetime distribution. The motivation was the need to model bathtub-shaped failure rates, useful for reliability and survival analysis. The failure rate function can also show an increasing shape.

== Definitions ==
=== Probability density function ===
Its probability density function is defined as:

$$f(x;\lambda,\beta) = \lambda \beta x^{\beta-1} \exp \left\{ x^\beta + \lambda \left(1 - \mathrm{e}^{x^\beta}\right) \right\}$$

where $x > 0$, and $\lambda > 0$ and $\beta > 0$ are shape parameters.

=== Cumulative distribution function ===
And its cumulative distribution function is:

$$F(x;\lambda,\beta) = 1 - \mathrm{e}^{\lambda\left(1 - \mathrm{e}^{x^\beta}\right)}$$

where $x > 0$.

=== Quantile function ===
The quantile function of the Chen distribution is given by:

$$Q(p;\lambda,\beta) = \left[ \ln \left\{ 1 - \frac{\ln(1 - p)}{\lambda} \right\} \right]^{\frac{1}{\beta}}$$

where $0 < p < 1$.

== Properties ==
=== Moments ===
The $r$th raw moment of the Chen distribution can be obtained through:

$$\mu'_r = \mathbb{E}[X^r] = \lambda \mathrm{e}^\lambda \int_1^\infty \mathrm{e}^{-\lambda x} (\ln x)^{\frac{r}{\beta}} \, \mathrm{d}x = \lambda \mathrm{e}^\lambda \Gamma\left(\frac{r}{\beta} + 1\right) E_0^{\frac{r}{\beta}}(\lambda)$$

for $r > 0$.

=== Skewness and kurtosis ===
The skewness and kurtosis measures can be obtained upon substituting the raw moments from the expressions:

$$\mathit{skewness} = \frac{\mu'_3 - 3\mu'_2 \mu + 2\mu^3}{\sigma^3}, \quad
\mathit{kurtosis} = \frac{\mu'_4 - 4\mu'_3 \mu + 6\mu'_2 \mu^2 - 3\mu^4}{\sigma^4}$$

=== Hazard rate ===
The hazard rate function of the Chen distribution is given by:

$$h(x;\lambda,\beta) = \lambda \beta x^{\beta-1} \mathrm{e}^{x^\beta}$$

where $x > 0$.

== Parameter estimation ==
Let $\mathbf{x} = (x_1, \ldots, x_n)$ be a random sample of size $n$ from the Chen distribution with cumulative probability function defined before. Then, the likelihood function of $(\lambda, \beta)$ based on the first $k$ order statistics is given by

$$L(\lambda, \beta) = \frac{n!}{(n-k)!} \lambda^k \beta^k \prod_{i=1}^k x_{(i)}^{\beta-1} \mathrm{e}^{\sum_{i=1}^k x_{(i)}^\beta + k\lambda - \lambda \sum_{i=1}^k \mathrm{e}^{x_{(i)}^\beta} + (n-k)\lambda - (n-k)\lambda \mathrm{e}^{x_{(k)}^\beta}}.$$

The components of the score vector $\boldsymbol{U}\left(\boldsymbol{\theta}\right)=\left[\frac{\partial \ell (\boldsymbol{\theta})}{\partial \lambda},\frac{\partial \ell (\boldsymbol{\theta})}{\partial \beta}\right]^\top$ are

$$\begin{align}
\frac{\partial \ell (\boldsymbol{\theta})}{\partial \lambda} = \frac{k}{\lambda} - \sum_{i=1}^k \mathrm{e}^{x_{(i)}^\beta} + n + (n-k)\mathrm{e}^{x_{(k)}^\beta}
\end{align}$$

and

$$\begin{align}
\frac{\partial \ell (\boldsymbol{\theta})}{\partial \beta} = \frac{k}{\beta} + \sum_{i=1}^k \log x_{(i)} + \sum_{i=1}^k x_{(i)}^\beta \log x_{(i)} - \lambda \left[ \sum_{i=1}^k \mathrm{e}^{x_{(i)}^\beta} x_{(i)}^\beta \log x_{(i)} + (n-k)\mathrm{e}^{x_{(k)}^\beta} \log x_{(k)} \right]
\end{align}$$

The MLEs of $\boldsymbol{\theta}$, denoted by $\hat{\boldsymbol{\theta}} = \left( \hat{\lambda}, \hat{\beta} \right)^\top$, are obtained as the simultaneous solution of $\boldsymbol{U}(\boldsymbol{\theta}) = \boldsymbol{0}$, where $\boldsymbol{0}$ is a two-dimensional null vector.

Specifically, $\hat{\beta}$ is obtained by solving the non-linear equation:

$$\frac{k}{\beta} + \sum_{i=1}^k \log x_{(i)} + \sum_{i=1}^k x_{(i)}^\beta \log x_{(i)} - \frac{k \left[ \sum_{i=1}^k \mathrm{e}^{x_{(i)}^\beta} x_{(i)}^\beta \log x_{(i)} + (n-k)\mathrm{e}^{x_{(k)}^\beta} x_{(k)}^\beta \log x_{(k)} \right]}{\sum_{i=1}^k \mathrm{e}^{x_{(i)}^\beta} - n - (n-k)\mathrm{e}^{x_{(k)}^\beta}} = 0$$

and $\hat{\lambda}$ is subsequently given in closed form by:

$$\hat{\lambda} = \frac{k}{\sum_{i=1}^k \mathrm{e}^{x_{(i)}^{\hat{\beta}}} - n - (n-k)\mathrm{e}^{x_{(k)}^{\hat{\beta}}}}$$

== Quantile Reparameterization ==
For regression and time-series modeling, it is more convenient to directly model the mean or median parameter of the distribution. So, to develop an ARMA model based on the Chen distribution, in 2023, Stone et al therefore reparameterized the Chen distribution in terms of its quantiles.

Let $q_\tau = Q_C(\tau; \lambda, \delta)$ represent the $\tau-$th quantile of the Chen distribution, and $\delta$ expressed as $\delta = \frac{\log(1-\tau)}{1-\exp(q_\tau^\lambda)}$. Then the reparameterized probability density function and the cumulative distribution function of the Chen distribution will be given, respectively, by

$$f(y; \lambda, q_\tau) = \frac{\log(1-\tau)}{1-\exp(q_\tau^\lambda)} \lambda y^{\lambda-1} \exp\left\{ \frac{\log(1-\tau)}{1-\exp(q_\tau^\lambda)} [1-\exp(y^\lambda)] + y^\lambda \right\}, \quad y, q_\tau > 0,$$

and

$$F(y; \lambda, q_\tau) = 1 - \exp\left\{ \frac{\log(1-\tau)}{1-\exp(q_\tau^\lambda)} [1-\exp(y^\lambda)] \right\}, \quad y > 0.$$

Then, if $\tau = 0.5$, $q_\tau$ will correspond to the median of $Y$. And $q_0.5 = \mu$

== CHARMA Model ==
To model asymmetric, continuous, positive, and time-dependent data, the Chen autoregressive moving average (CHARMA) model has been developed. The model assumes that the conditional distribution of the variable of interest follows the reparameterized Chen distribution. By defining $\tau = 0.5$, then the conditional density function of $Y_t$ is given by

$$f(y_t; \lambda, \mu_t \mid \mathcal{F}_{t-1}) = \frac{\log(0.5)}{1-\exp(\mu_t^\lambda)} \lambda y_t^{\lambda-1} \exp\left\{ \frac{\log(0.5)}{1-\exp(\mu_t^\lambda)} [1-\exp(y_t^\lambda)] + y_t^\lambda \right\}, \quad y_t > 0,$$

where $\mu_t$ is the conditional median of $Y_t$, and $\lambda$ is considered fixed for all $t \in \mathbb{Z}$. The structure of the CHARMA model is given by

$$\eta_t = g(\mu_t) = \beta_0 + \mathbf{x}_t^\top \boldsymbol{\beta} + \sum_{j=1}^{p} \phi_j [g(y_{t-j}) - \mathbf{x}_{t-j}^\top \boldsymbol{\beta}] + \sum_{j=1}^{q} \theta_j r_{t-j},$$

where $\eta_t$ represents the linear predictor, $\beta_0$ is an intercept, $\boldsymbol{\beta} = (\beta_1, \dots, \beta_k)^\top$ is an unknown $k$-dimensional parameter vector associated with exogenous covariates, $\mathbf{x}_t = (x_{t1}, \dots, x_{tk})^\top$ is the $k$-dimensional vector of explanatory covariates at time $t$, $\boldsymbol{\phi} = (\phi_1, \dots, \phi_p)^\top$ and $\boldsymbol{\theta} = (\theta_1, \dots, \theta_q)^\top$ are the vectors of autoregressive and moving average parameters, respectively, and $g(\cdot)$ is a strictly monotonic and twice-differentiable link function, where $g : \mathbb{R}^+ \to \mathbb{R}$.

=== Conditional Likelihood Inference ===
the conditional log-likelihood function of the CHARMA model is given by

$$\ell(\boldsymbol{\gamma}) = \sum_{t=m+1}^{n} \ell_t(\mu_t, \lambda),$$

where

$$\ell_t(\mu_t, \lambda) = \log\left[ \frac{\log(0.5)}{1-\exp(\mu_t^\lambda)} \right] + (\lambda-1)\log(y_t) + \log(\lambda) + \frac{\log(0.5)[1-\exp(y_t^\lambda)]}{1-\exp(\mu_t^\lambda)} + y_t^\lambda.$$

And the derivatives of $\ell_t(\mu_t, \lambda)$ with respect to $\mu_t$ and $\lambda$ respectively is written as follows

$$\frac{\partial \ell_t(\mu_t, \lambda)}{\partial \mu_t} = \frac{\lambda \exp(\mu_t^\lambda) \mu_t^{\lambda-1}}{1-\exp(\mu_t^\lambda)} + \frac{\lambda \log(0.5) \exp(\mu_t^\lambda) \mu_t^{\lambda-1} [1-\exp(y_t^\lambda)]}{[1-\exp(\mu_t^\lambda)]^2},$$

and

$$\begin{aligned}
\frac{\partial \ell_t(\mu_t, \lambda)}{\partial \lambda} &= \frac{\mu_t^\lambda \exp(\mu_t^\lambda) \log(\mu_t)}{1-\exp(\mu_t^\lambda)} + \frac{1}{\lambda} + \frac{\log(0.5)\exp(\mu_t^\lambda)\mu_t^\lambda \log(\mu_t)[1-\exp(y_t^\lambda)]}{[1-\exp(\mu_t^\lambda)]^2} \\
&\quad + \log(y_t) - \frac{\log(0.5)\exp(y_t^\lambda)y_t^\lambda \log(y_t)}{1-\exp(\mu_t^\lambda)} + y_t^\lambda \log(y_t).
\end{aligned}$$

== Applications ==
The Chen distribution was utilized in:

- Reliability inference for lifetime data in oil breakdown and cancer patient survival data.
- Graft survival times of renal transplant patients.
- The CHARMA model was utilized in the analysis of meteorological time-series data.
