= Displaced Poisson distribution =

Displaced Poisson Distribution
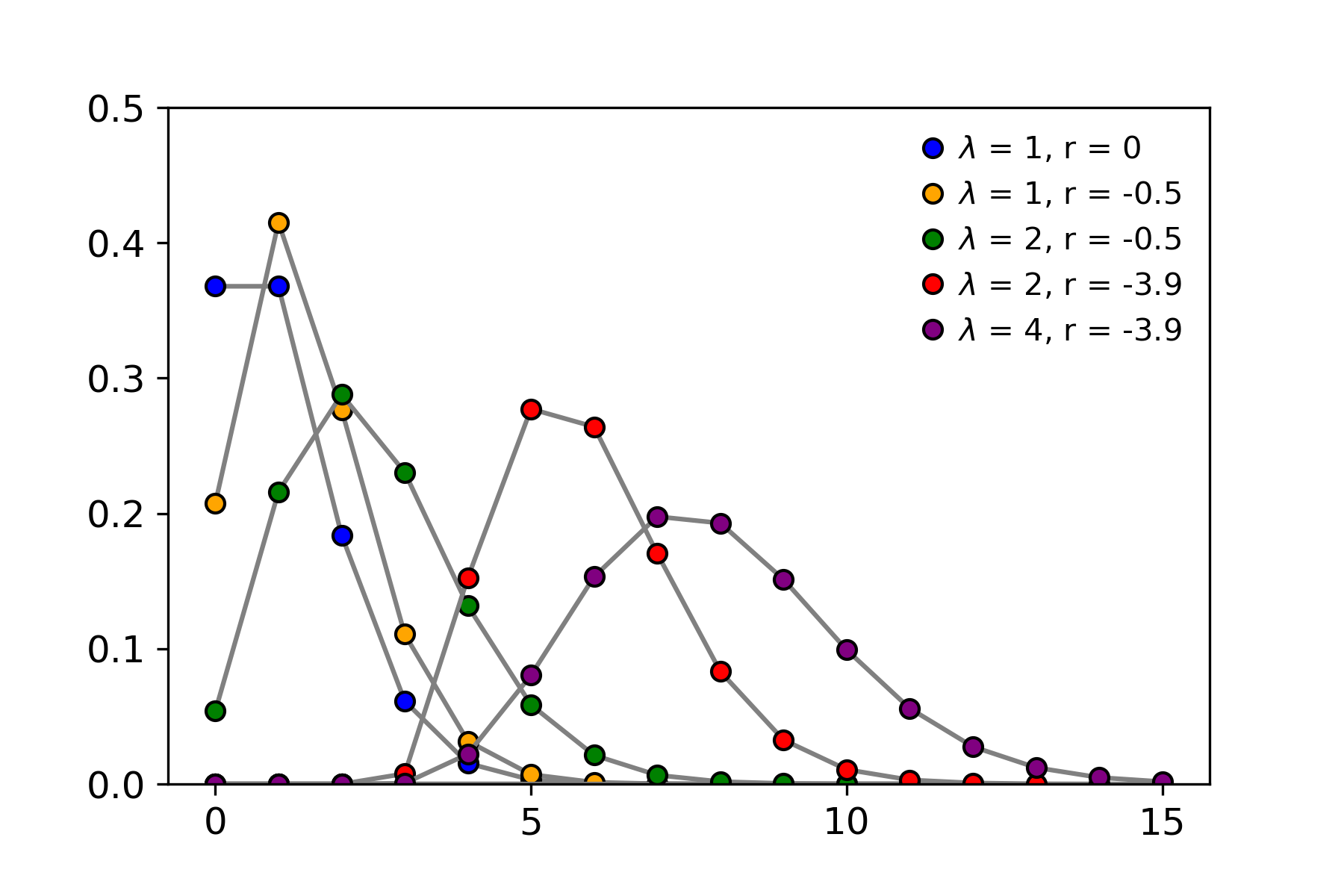
- Probability mass function Displaced Poisson distributions for several values of $\lambda$ and $r$. At $r=0$, the Poisson distribution is recovered. The probability mass function is only defined at integer values.
- Parameters: $\lambda\in (0, \infty)$, $r\in (-\infty, \infty)$
- Support: $k \in \mathbb{N}_0$
- Mean: $\lambda - r$
- Mode: $$\begin{cases} \left\lceil \lambda - r \right\rceil - 1, \left\lfloor \lambda - r \right\rfloor & \text{if } \lambda \geq r+1\\ 0 & \text{if } \lambda < r+1\\ \end{cases}$$
- Variance: $\lambda$
- MGF: $e^{\lambda \left( e^{t-1} \right) - tr } \cdot \dfrac{I \left( r+s, \lambda e^{t} \right)}{I \left( r+s, \lambda \right)}$, $I \left(r, \lambda \right) = \sum^\infty_{y=r} \dfrac{e^{-\lambda} \lambda^y}{y!}$ When $r$ is a negative integer, this becomes $e^{\lambda \left( e^{t-1} \right) - tr }$

In statistics, the displaced Poisson, also known as the hyper-Poisson distribution, is a generalization of the Poisson distribution.

== Definitions ==
=== Probability mass function ===
The probability mass function is

$$P(X=n) = \begin{cases}
e^{-\lambda}\dfrac{\lambda^{n+r}}{\left(n+r\right)!}\cdot\dfrac{1}{I\left(r,  \lambda\right)}, \quad n=0,1,2,\ldots &\text{if } r\geq 0\\[10pt]
e^{-\lambda}\dfrac{\lambda^{n+r}}{\left(n+r\right)!}\cdot\dfrac{1}{I\left(r+s,\lambda\right)},\quad n=s,s+1,s+2,\ldots &\text{otherwise}
\end{cases}$$

where $\lambda>0$ and r is a new parameter; the Poisson distribution is recovered at r = 0. Here $I\left(r,\lambda\right)$ is the Pearson's incomplete gamma function:

$$I(r,\lambda)=\sum^\infty_{y=r}\frac{e^{-\lambda} \lambda^y}{y!},$$

where s is the integral part of r. The motivation given by Staff is that the ratio of successive probabilities in the Poisson distribution (that is $P(X=n)/P(X=n-1)$) is given by $\lambda/n$ for $n>0$ and the displaced Poisson generalizes this ratio to $\lambda/\left(n+r\right)$.

=== Examples ===
One of the limitations of the Poisson distribution is that it assumes equidispersion – the mean and variance of the variable are equal. The displaced Poisson distribution may be useful to model underdispersed or overdispersed data, such as:

- the distribution of insect populations in crop fields;
- the number of flowers on plants;
- motor vehicle crash counts; and
- word or sentence lengths in writing.

== Properties ==
=== Descriptive Statistics ===
- For a displaced Poisson-distributed random variable, the mean is equal to $\lambda - r$ and the variance is equal to $\lambda$.
- The mode of a displaced Poisson-distributed random variable are the integer values bounded by $\lambda - r - 1$ and $\lambda - r$ when $\lambda \geq r+1$. When $\lambda < r+1$, there is a single mode at $x=0$.
- The first cumulant $\kappa_{1}$ is equal to $\lambda - r$ and all subsequent cumulants $\kappa_{n}, n \geq 2$ are equal to $\lambda$.
