= Gamma/Gompertz distribution =

Probability distribution

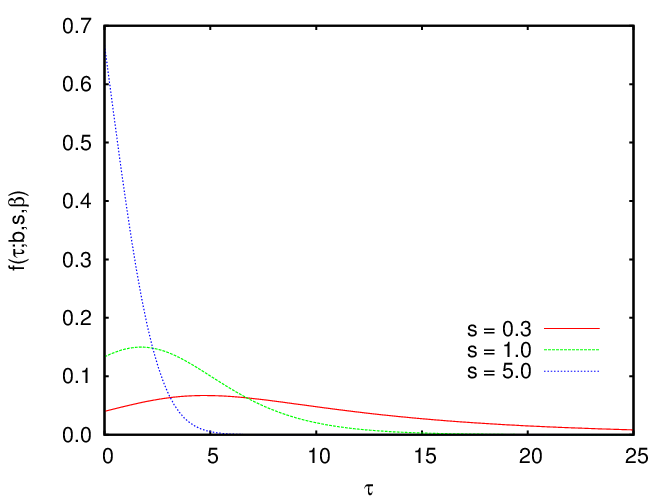
- Probability density function Note: b=0.4, β=3

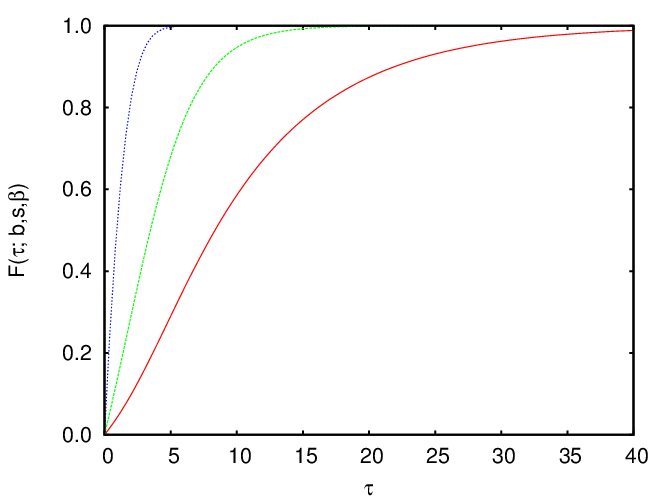
- Cumulative distribution function
- Parameters: $b, s, \beta > 0\,\!$
- Support: $x \in [0, \infty)\!$
- PDF: $bse^{bx}\beta^{s}/\left(\beta-1+e^{bx}\right)^{s+1} \text{where } b,s,\beta > 0$
- CDF: $1-\beta^{s}/\left(\beta-1+e^{bx}\right)^{s}, x>0, b,s,\beta>0$ $1-e^{-bsx}, \beta=1$
- Mean: $=\left(1/b\right)\left(1/s\right){_2\text{F}_1}\left(s,1;s+1;\left(\beta-1\right)/\beta\right),$ $b,s>0, \beta\ne1$ $=\left(1/b\right)\left[\beta/\left(\beta-1\right)\right]\ln\left(\beta\right),$ $b>0,s=1,\beta\ne1$ $=1/\left(bs\right),\quad b,s>0,\beta=1$
- Median: $\left(1/b\right)\ln\{\beta\left[\left(1/2\right)^{-1/s}-1\right]+1\}$
- Mode: $$\begin{align}x^*& = (1/b)\ln\left[(1/s)(\beta-1)\right], \\&\text{with } 0<\text{F}(x^*)<1-(\beta s)^s/\left[(\beta-1)(s+1)\right]^s<0.632121,\\& \beta > s+1\\& = 0, \quad \beta\le s+1\\\end{align}$$
- Variance: $=2(1/b^{2})(1/s^{2})\beta^{s} {_3\text{F}_2}(s,s,s;s+1,s+1;1-\beta)$ $- \text{E}^{2}(\tau|b,s,\beta), \quad \beta \ne 1$ $=(1/b^{2})(1/s^{2}), \quad \beta = 1$ $\text{with}$ ${_3\text{F}_2}(a,b,c;d,e;z) = \sum_{k=0}^\infty\{(a)_k(b)_k(c)_k/[(d)_k(e)_k]\}z^k/k!$ $\text{and}$ $(a)_k=\Gamma(a+k)/\Gamma(a)$
- MGF: $\text{E}(e^{-tx})$ $=\beta^{s}[sb/(t+sb)]{_2\text{F}_1}(s+1,(t/b)+s;(t/b)+s+1;1-\beta),$ $\quad \beta \ne 1$ $= sb/(t+sb), \quad \beta =1$ $\text{with }{_2\text{F}_1}(a,b;c;z) = \sum_{k=0}^\infty[(a)_k(b)_k/(c)_k]z^k/k!$

In probability and statistics, the Gamma/Gompertz distribution is a continuous probability distribution. It has been used as an aggregate-level model of customer lifetime and a model of mortality risks.

== Specification ==
=== Probability density function ===
The probability density function of the Gamma/Gompertz distribution is:

$$f(x;b,s,\beta) = \frac{bse^{bx}\beta^{s}}{\left(\beta-1+e^{bx}\right)^{s+1}}$$

where $b > 0$ is the scale parameter and $\beta, s > 0\,\!$ are the shape parameters of the Gamma/Gompertz distribution.

=== Cumulative distribution function ===
The cumulative distribution function of the Gamma/Gompertz distribution is:

$$\begin{align}F(x;b,s,\beta)& = 1 - \frac{\beta^s}{\left(\beta-1+e^{bx}\right)^s}, {\ }x>0, {\ } b,s,\beta>0 \\[6pt]
& = 1-e^{-bsx}, {\ }\beta=1\\\end{align}$$

=== Moment generating function ===
The moment generating function is given by:

$$\begin{align}
\text{E}(e^{-tx})=
\begin{cases}\displaystyle
\beta^s \frac{sb}{t+sb}{\ } {_2\text{F}_1}(s+1,(t/b)+s;(t/b)+s+1;1-\beta), & \beta \ne 1; \\
\displaystyle
\frac{sb}{t+sb},& \beta =1.
\end{cases}
\end{align}$$

where ${_2\text{F}_1}(a,b;c;z) = \sum_{k=0}^\infty[(a)_k(b)_k/(c)_k]z^k/k!$ is a Hypergeometric function.

== Properties ==
The Gamma/Gompertz distribution is a flexible distribution that can be skewed to the right or to the left.

== Related distributions ==
- When β = 1, this reduces to an Exponential distribution with parameter sb.
- The gamma distribution is a natural conjugate prior to a Gompertz likelihood with known, scale parameter $b \,\!.$
- When the shape parameter $\eta\,\!$ of a Gompertz distribution varies according to a gamma distribution with shape parameter $\alpha\,\!$ and scale parameter $\beta\,\!$ (mean = $\alpha/\beta\,\!$), the distribution of $x$ is Gamma/Gompertz.

== See also ==
- Gompertz distribution
- Customer lifetime value
