= Uniform distribution on a Stiefel manifold =

Matrix-variate probability distribution

The uniform distribution on a Stiefel manifold is a matrix-variate distribution that plays an important role in multivariate statistics. There one often encounters integrals over the orthogonal group or over the Stiefel manifold with respect to an invariant measure. For example, this distribution arises in the study of the functional determinant under transformations involving orthogonal or semi-orthogonal matrices. The uniform distribution on the Stiefel manifold corresponds to the normalized Haar measure on the Stiefel manifold.

A random matrix uniformly distributed on the Stiefel manifold is invariant under the two-sided group action of the product $O(p)\times O(n)$ of orthogonal groups, i.e. $X \sim V_1 X V_2$ for all $V_1 \in O(p)$ and $V_2 \in O(n)$.

== Uniform Distribution on a Stiefel Manifold ==
=== Introduction ===
Let $V_{p,n} := V_n(\mathbb{R}^p)$ be the Stiefel manifold, i.e., the set of all orthonormal $n$-frames in $\mathbb{R}^p$ for $n \leq p$. This manifold can also be represented as the matrix set

$$V_{p,n} = \{ X \in \mathbb{R}^{p \times n} \colon X'X = I_n \}$$.

The Stiefel manifold is homeomorphic to the quotient space of the orthogonal groups

$V_{p,n} \cong O(p)/O(p-n).$ These two can be identified, and in the case $p = n$ we obtain the full orthogonal group. The Stiefel manifold inherits the left group action
$$X \mapsto VX, \quad V \in O(p).$$

Here, $O(p-n)$ is a compact, closed Lie subgroup of $O(p)$. By Haar's theorem there exists a Haar measure on $O(p)$ which induces an invariant measure on the quotient space $O(p)/O(p-n)$.

=== Derivation of the Haar Measure on the Stiefel Manifold ===
Let $X \in O(p)$. Differentiating $X'X = I_p$ yields: $dX' X + X' dX = 0.$ Let $x_1, \dots, x_p$ be the columns of $X = (x_1, \dots, x_p)$. The exterior product of the superdiagonal elements defines a differential form

$$(X' dX) := \bigwedge_{1 \leq i < j \leq p} x_i' dx_j = \bigwedge_{1 \leq i < j \leq p} (x_{1i} dx_{1j} + \cdots + x_{pi} dx_{pj}).$$

of degree $\tfrac{1}{2}p(p-1)$. This form is invariant under both left and right group actions of the orthogonal group. Integration of this form gives the Haar measure on $O(p)$.

Let $X \in V_{p,n}$ be an element of the Stiefel manifold with the form $X = (x_1, \dots, x_n)$. We extend this to an orthogonal matrix $[X : X^\perp] = (x_1, \dots, x_p) \in O(p)$ by choosing $X^\perp = (x_{n+1}, \dots, x_p)$. The induced differential form on the Stiefel manifold is

$$(X' dX) := \bigwedge_{j = 1}^{p-n} \bigwedge_{i = 1}^n x_{n+j}' dx_i \bigwedge_{1 \leq i < j \leq n} x_j' dx_i$$

and of maximal degree $\tfrac{1}{2}n(2p - n - 1)$.

This differential form is independent of the specific choice of $X^\perp$ and remains invariant under the left and right actions of the orthogonal group.

=== Integration of the Haar Measure ===
It can be shown that integration with respect to the invariant measure over the Stiefel manifold satisfies the recursion:

$$\int_{V_{p,n}} (X' dX) = A_p \int_{V_{p-1,n-1}} (X' dX)_{-1}, \quad A_p := \frac{2 \pi^{p/2}}{\Gamma(\tfrac{1}{2}p)}$$

where $(X' dX)_{-1}$ denotes the invariant measure on $V_{p-1,n-1}$.

This leads to the formula

$$v(p,n) := \int_{V_{p,n}} (X' dX) = \frac{2^n \pi^{pn/2}}{\Gamma_n(\tfrac{1}{2}p)},$$

where $\Gamma_n$ is the multivariate gamma function.

=== Uniform Distribution on the Stiefel Manifold ===
The uniform distribution is the unique Haar probability measure given by

$$[dX] = \frac{1}{v(p,n)} (X' dX),$$

where

$$(X' dX) = \bigwedge_{j = 1}^{p-n} \bigwedge_{i = 1}^n x_{n+j}' dx_i \bigwedge_{1 \leq i < j \leq n} x_j' dx_i$$

and the normalization constant is

$v(p,n) = \frac{2^n \pi^{pn/2}}{\Gamma_n(\tfrac{1}{2}p)}.$

== Bibliography ==
- Gupta, Arjun K.; Nagar, D. K. Matrix Variate Distributions. Chapman & Hall / CRC. ISBN 1-58488-046-5.
- Chikuse, Yasuko (2003). Statistics on Special Manifolds. Lecture Notes in Statistics. Vol. 174. New York: Springer. doi:10.1007/978-0-387-21540-2.
- Chikuse, Yasuko (1990). "Distributions of orientations on Stiefel manifolds". Journal of Multivariate Analysis. 33 (2): 247–264. doi:10.1016/0047-259X(90)90049-N.
- James, Alan Treleven (1954). "Normal Multivariate Analysis and the Orthogonal Group". Annals of Mathematical Statistics. 25 (1): 40–75. doi:10.1214/aoms/1177728846.
- Mardia, K. V.; Khatri, C. G. (1977). "Uniform distribution on a Stiefel manifold". Journal of Multivariate Analysis. 7 (3): 468–473. doi:10.1016/0047-259X(77)90087-2.
