= Wrapped Lévy distribution =

Probability distribution on the circle

In probability theory and directional statistics, a wrapped Lévy distribution is a wrapped probability distribution that results from the "wrapping" of the Lévy distribution around the unit circle.

== Description ==
The pdf of the wrapped Lévy distribution is

$$f_{WL}(\theta;\mu,c)=\sum_{n=-\infty}^\infty \sqrt{\frac{c}{2\pi}}\,\frac{e^{-c/2(\theta+2\pi n-\mu)}}{(\theta+2\pi n-\mu)^{3/2}}$$

where the value of the summand is taken to be zero when $\theta+2\pi n-\mu \le 0$, $c$ is the scale factor and $\mu$ is the location parameter. Expressing the above pdf in terms of the characteristic function of the Lévy distribution yields:

$$f_{WL}(\theta;\mu,c)=\frac{1}{2\pi}\sum_{n=-\infty}^\infty e^{-in(\theta-\mu)-\sqrt{c|n|}\,(1-i\sgn{n})}=\frac{1}{2\pi}\left(1 + 2\sum_{n=1}^\infty e^{-\sqrt{cn}}\cos\left(n(\theta-\mu) - \sqrt{cn}\,\right)\right)$$

In terms of the circular variable $z=e^{i\theta}$ the circular moments of the wrapped Lévy distribution are the characteristic function of the Lévy distribution evaluated at integer arguments:

$$\langle z^n\rangle=\int_\Gamma e^{in\theta}\,f_{WL}(\theta;\mu,c)\,d\theta = e^{i n \mu-\sqrt{c|n|}\,(1-i\sgn(n))}.$$

where $\Gamma\,$ is some interval of length $2\pi$. The first moment is then the expectation value of z, also known as the mean resultant, or mean resultant vector:

$$\langle z \rangle=e^{i\mu-\sqrt{c}(1-i)}$$

The mean angle is

$$\theta_\mu=\mathrm{Arg}\langle z \rangle = \mu+\sqrt{c}$$

and the length of the mean resultant is

$$R=|\langle z \rangle| = e^{-\sqrt{c}}$$

== See also ==
- Wrapped distribution
- Directional statistics
