= P-Laplacian =

Elliptic partial differential operator

In mathematics, the p-Laplacian, or the p-Laplace operator, is a quasilinear elliptic partial differential operator of 2nd order. It is a nonlinear generalization of the Laplace operator, where $p$ is allowed to range over $1 < p < \infty$. It is written as

$$\Delta_p u:=\mathrm{div}(|\nabla u|^{p-2} \nabla u).$$

Where the $|\nabla u|^{p-2}$ is defined as

$$\quad |\nabla u|^{p-2} = \left[ \textstyle \left(\frac{\partial u}{\partial x_1}\right)^2
+ \cdots + \left(\frac{\partial u}{\partial x_n}\right)^2
\right]^\frac{p-2}{2}$$

In the special case when $p=2$, this operator reduces to the usual Laplacian. In general solutions of equations involving the p-Laplacian do not have second order derivatives in classical sense, thus solutions to these equations have to be understood as weak solutions. For example, we say that a function u belonging to the Sobolev space $W^{1,p}(\Omega)$ is a weak solution of

$$\Delta_p u=0 \mbox{ in } \Omega$$

if for every test function $\varphi\in C^\infty_0(\Omega)$ we have

$$\int_\Omega |\nabla u|^{p-2} \nabla u\cdot \nabla\varphi\,dx=0$$

where $\cdot$ denotes the standard scalar product.

== Energy formulation ==
The weak solution of the p-Laplace equation with Dirichlet boundary conditions

$$\begin{cases}
-\Delta_p u = f& \mbox{ in }\Omega\\
u=g & \mbox{ on }\partial\Omega
\end{cases}$$

in an open bounded set $\Omega\subseteq\mathbb{R}^N$ is the minimizer of the energy functional

$$J(u) = \frac{1}{p}\,\int_\Omega |\nabla u|^p \,dx-\int_\Omega f\,u\,dx$$

among all functions in the Sobolev space $W^{1,p}(\Omega)$ satisfying the boundary conditions in the sense that $u-g\in W^{1,p}_0(\Omega)$ (when $\Omega$ has a smooth boundary, this is equivalent to require that functions coincide with the boundary datum in trace sense). In the particular case $f=1, g=0$ and $\Omega$ is a ball of radius 1, the weak solution of the problem above can be explicitly computed and is given by

$$u(x)=C\, \left(1-|x|^\frac{p}{p-1}\right)$$

where $C$ is a suitable constant depending on the dimension $N$ and on $p$ only. Observe that for $p>2$ the solution is not twice differentiable in classical sense.

== See also ==
- Infinity Laplacian

== Sources ==
- Evans, Lawrence C. (1982). "A New Proof of Local $C^{1,\alpha}$ Regularity for Solutions of Certain Degenerate Elliptic P.D.E." Journal of Differential Equations. 45: 356–373. doi:10.1016/0022-0396(82)90033-x. MR 0672713.
- Lewis, John L. (1977). "Capacitary functions in convex rings". Archive for Rational Mechanics and Analysis. 66 (3): 201–224. Bibcode:1977ArRMA..66..201L. doi:10.1007/bf00250671. MR 0477094. S2CID 120469946.
