= Wrapped asymmetric Laplace distribution =

Probability distribution on the circle

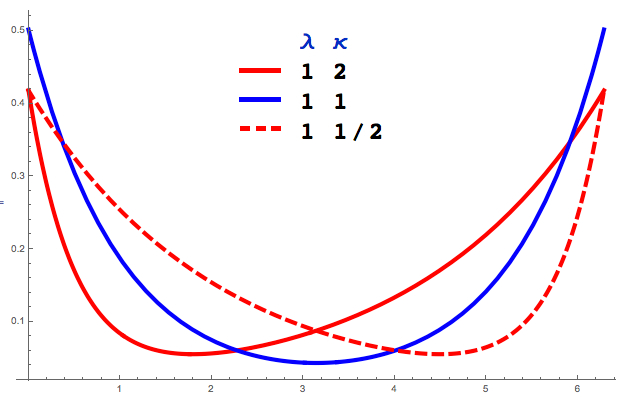
- Probability density function Wrapped asymmetric Laplace PDF with m = 0.Note that the κ = 2 and 1/2 curves are mirror images about θ=π
- Parameters: $m$ location $( 0 \le m < 2 \pi )$ $\lambda > 0$ scale (real) $\kappa > 0$ asymmetry (real)
- Support: $0\le\theta<2\pi$
- PDF: (see article)
- Mean: $m$ (circular)
- Variance: $1-\frac{\lambda ^2}{\sqrt{\left(\frac{1}{\kappa ^2}+\lambda^2 \right) \left(\kappa ^2+\lambda ^2\right)}}$ (circular)
- CF: $\frac{\lambda^2 e^{i m n}}{\left(n-i \lambda/\kappa \right) \left(n+i \lambda\kappa \right)}$

In probability theory and directional statistics, a wrapped asymmetric Laplace distribution is a wrapped probability distribution that results from the "wrapping" of the asymmetric Laplace distribution around the unit circle. For the symmetric case (asymmetry parameter κ = 1), the distribution becomes a wrapped Laplace distribution. The distribution of the ratio of two circular variates (Z) from two different wrapped exponential distributions will have a wrapped asymmetric Laplace distribution. These distributions find application in stochastic modelling of financial data.

== Definition ==
The probability density function of the wrapped asymmetric Laplace distribution is:

$$\begin{align}
f_{WAL}(\theta;m,\lambda,\kappa)
& =\sum_{k=-\infty}^\infty f_{AL}(\theta+2 \pi k,m,\lambda,\kappa) \\[10pt]
& =  \dfrac{\kappa\lambda}{\kappa^2+1}
\begin{cases}
\dfrac{e^{-(\theta-m)\lambda\kappa}} {1-e^{-2\pi\lambda\kappa}}-
\dfrac{e^{(\theta-m)\lambda/\kappa}} {1-e^{2\pi\lambda/\kappa}}
& \text{if } \theta \geq m
\\[12pt]
\dfrac{e^{-(\theta-m)\lambda\kappa}} {e^{2 \pi \lambda\kappa}-1}-
\dfrac{e^{ (\theta-m)\lambda/\kappa}}  {e^{-2\pi\lambda/\kappa }-1}
& \text{if }\theta<m
\end{cases}
\end{align}$$

where $f_{AL}$ is the asymmetric Laplace distribution. The angular parameter is restricted to $0 \le \theta < 2\pi$. The scale parameter is $\lambda > 0$ which is the scale parameter of the unwrapped distribution and $\kappa > 0$ is the asymmetry parameter of the unwrapped distribution.

The cumulative distribution function $F_{WAL}$ is therefore:

$$F_{WAL}(\theta;m,\lambda,\kappa)=\dfrac{\kappa\lambda}{\kappa^2+1}
\begin{cases}
\dfrac{e^{m\lambda\kappa}(1-e^{-\theta\lambda\kappa})}{\lambda\kappa(e^{2\pi\lambda\kappa}-1)}+\dfrac{\kappa e^{-m\lambda/\kappa}(1-e^{\theta\lambda/\kappa})}{\lambda(e^{-2\pi\lambda/\kappa}-1)} & \text{if }\theta \leq m\\
\dfrac{1-e^{-(\theta-m)\lambda\kappa}}{\lambda\kappa(1-e^{-2\pi\lambda\kappa})}+\dfrac{\kappa(1-e^{(\theta-m)\lambda/\kappa})}{\lambda(1-e^{2\pi\lambda/\kappa})}+\dfrac{e^{m\lambda\kappa}-1}{\lambda\kappa(e^{2\pi\lambda\kappa}-1)}+\dfrac{\kappa(e^{-m\lambda/\kappa}-1)}{\lambda(e^{-2\pi\lambda/\kappa}-1)} &\text{if } \theta > m
\end{cases}$$

== Characteristic function ==
The characteristic function of the wrapped asymmetric Laplace is just the characteristic function of the asymmetric Laplace function evaluated at integer arguments:

$$\varphi_n(m,\lambda,\kappa)=\frac{\lambda^2 e^{i m n}}{\left(n-i \lambda/\kappa \right) \left(n+i \lambda\kappa \right)}$$

which yields an alternate expression for the wrapped asymmetric Laplace PDF in terms of the circular variable z=e^{i(θ-m)} valid for all real θ and m:

$$\begin{align}
f_{WAL}(z;m,\lambda,\kappa)
&= \frac{1}{2\pi}\sum_{n=-\infty}^\infty \varphi_n(0,\lambda,\kappa)z^{-n} \\[10pt]
&=   \frac{\lambda}{\pi(\kappa+1/\kappa)}  \begin{cases}
\textrm{Im}\left(\Phi (z,1,-i  \lambda\kappa  )-\Phi \left(z,1,i \lambda /\kappa \right)\right)-\frac{1}{2 \pi }
& \text{if }z \ne 1
\\[12pt]
\coth(\pi\lambda\kappa)+\coth(\pi\lambda/\kappa)
& \text{if }z=1
\end{cases}
\end{align}$$

where $\Phi()$ is the Lerch transcendent function and coth() is the hyperbolic cotangent function.

== Circular moments ==
In terms of the circular variable $z=e^{i\theta}$ the circular moments of the wrapped asymmetric Laplace distribution are the characteristic function of the asymmetric Laplace distribution evaluated at integer arguments:

$$\langle z^n\rangle=\varphi_n(m,\lambda,\kappa)$$

The first moment is then the average value of z, also known as the mean resultant, or mean resultant vector:

$$\langle z \rangle
=\frac{\lambda^2 e^{i m}}{\left(1-i \lambda/\kappa \right) \left(1+i \lambda\kappa \right)}$$

The mean angle is $(-\pi \le \langle \theta \rangle \leq \pi)$

$$\langle \theta \rangle=\arg(\,\langle z \rangle\,)=\arg(e^{i m})$$

and the length of the mean resultant is

$$R=|\langle  z  \rangle| = \frac{\lambda ^2}{\sqrt{\left(\frac{1}{\kappa ^2}+\lambda^2 \right) \left(\kappa ^2+\lambda ^2\right)}}.$$

The circular variance is then 1 − R

== Generation of random variates ==
If X is a random variate drawn from an asymmetric Laplace distribution (ALD), then $Z=e^{i X}$ will be a circular variate drawn from the wrapped ALD, and, $\theta=\arg(Z)+\pi$ will be an angular variate drawn from the wrapped ALD with $0<\theta\leq 2 \pi$.

Since the ALD is the distribution of the difference of two variates drawn from the exponential distribution, it follows that if Z_{1} is drawn from a wrapped exponential distribution with mean m_{1} and rate λ/κ and Z_{2} is drawn from a wrapped exponential distribution with mean m_{2} and rate λκ, then Z_{1}/Z_{2} will be a circular variate drawn from the wrapped ALD with parameters ( m_{1} - m_{2} , λ, κ) and $\theta=\arg(Z_1/Z_2)+\pi$ will be an angular variate drawn from that wrapped ALD with $-\pi<\theta\leq \pi$.

== See also ==
- Wrapped distribution
- Directional statistics
