= Infinity Laplacian =

In mathematics, the infinity Laplace (or $L^\infty$-Laplace) operator is a 2nd-order partial differential operator, commonly abbreviated $\Delta_\infty$. It is alternately defined, for a function $u:\R^n\longrightarrow\R$ of the variables $x=(x_1,\dots,x_n)$, by

$$\Delta_\infty u = \langle Du, D^2 u \, Du \rangle = \sum_{i,j=1}^n \frac{\partial^2 u}{\partial x_i \, \partial x_j} \frac{\partial u}{\partial x_i} \frac{\partial u}{\partial x_j}$$

or

$$\Delta_\infty u = \frac{\langle Du, D^2 u \, Du \rangle}{|Du|^2} = \frac{1}{|Du|^2} \sum_{i,j=1}^n \frac{\partial^2 u}{\partial x_i \, \partial x_j} \frac{\partial u}{\partial x_i} \frac{\partial u}{\partial x_j},$$

where $Du$ denotes the gradient vector, $D^2u$ denotes the Hessian matrix, and $\langle \cdot,\cdot\rangle$ denotes the Euclidean inner product. The first version avoids the singularity which occurs when the gradient vanishes, while the second version is homogeneous of order zero in the gradient. Verbally, the second version is the second derivative in the direction of the gradient. In the case of the infinity Laplace equation $\Delta_\infty u = 0$, the two definitions are equivalent.

While the equation involves second derivatives, usually (generalized) solutions are not twice differentiable, as evidenced by the well-known Aronsson solution $u(x,y) = |x|^{4/3} - |y|^{4/3}$. For this reason the correct notion of solutions is that given by the viscosity solutions.

Viscosity solutions to the equation $\Delta_\infty u = 0$ are also known as infinity harmonic functions. This terminology arises from the fact that the infinity Laplace operator first arose in the study of absolute minimizers for $\| Du \|_{L^\infty}$, and it can be viewed in a certain sense as the limit of the p-Laplacian as $p \rightarrow \infty$. More recently, viscosity solutions to the infinity Laplace equation have been identified with the payoff functions from randomized tug-of-war games. The game theory point of view has significantly improved the understanding of the partial differential equation itself.

== Discrete version and game theory ==
A defining property of the usual $L^2$-harmonic functions is the mean value property. That has a natural and important discrete version: a real-valued function $f$ on a finite or infinite graph $G(V,E)$ is discrete harmonic on a subset $U\subseteq V$ if

$$f(x)=\frac{1}{\deg(x)}\sum_{y\sim x} f(y)$$

for all $x\in U$. Similarly, the vanishing second derivative in the direction of the gradient has a natural discrete version:

$$f(x)=\frac{\sup \{f(y): y\sim x\} + \inf \{f(y): y\sim x\}}{2}$$.

In this equation, we used sup and inf instead of max and min because the graph $G(V,E)$ does not have to be locally finite (i.e., to have finite degrees): a key example is when $V(G)$ is the set of points in a domain in $\R^d$, and $(x,y)\in E(G)$ if their Euclidean distance is at most $\epsilon$. The importance of this example lies in the following.

Consider a bounded open set $D\subseteq \R^d$ with smooth boundary $\partial D$, and a continuous function $f:\partial D\longrightarrow\R$. In the $L^2$-case, an approximation of the harmonic extension of f to D is given by taking a lattice $\Z_\epsilon^d$ with small mesh size $\epsilon$, letting $G_\epsilon(V,E)=D\cap\Z_\epsilon^d$ and $\partial V\subset V$ be the set of vertices with degree less than 2d, taking a natural approximation $f_\epsilon:\partial V\longrightarrow\R$, and then taking the unique discrete harmonic extension of $f_\epsilon$ to V. However, it is easy to see by examples that this does not work for the $L^\infty$-case. Instead, as it turns out, one should take the continuum graph with all edges of length at most $\epsilon$, mentioned above.

Now, a probabilistic way of looking at the $L^2$-harmonic extension of $f_\epsilon$ from $\partial V$ to $V$ is that

$$f_\epsilon(x)=\mathbb{E}\big[f_\epsilon(X_\tau)\,|\, X_0=x\big]$$,

where $X_0,X_1,\dots$ is the simple random walk on $G_\epsilon(V,E)$ started at $X_0=x$, and $\tau$ is the hitting time of $\partial V$.

For the $L^\infty$-case, we need game theory. A token is started at location $x\in V(G)$, and $f:\partial V\longrightarrow \R$ is given. There are two players, in each turn they flip a fair coin, and the winner can move the token to any neighbour of the current location. The game ends when the token reaches $\partial V$ at some time $\tau$ and location $X_\tau$, at which point the first player gets the amount $f(X_\tau)$ from the second player. Therefore, the first player wants to maximize $f(X_\tau)$, while the second player wants to minimize it. If both players play optimally (which has a well-defined meaning in game theory), the expected payoff $\mathbb{E}[f(X_\tau)\,|\, X_0=x]$ to the first player is a discrete infinity harmonic function, as defined above.

There is a game theory approach to the p-Laplacian, too, interpolating between simple random walk and the above random tug-of-war game.

== Sources ==
- Barron, Emmanuel Nicholas; Evans, Lawrence C.; Jensen, Robert (2008), "The infinity Laplacian, Aronsson's equation and their generalizations" (PDF), Transactions of the American Mathematical Society, 360 (1): 77–101, doi:10.1090/S0002-9947-07-04338-3, ISSN 0002-9947
- Peres, Yuval; Schramm, Oded; Sheffield, Scott; Wilson, David B. (2009), "Tug-of-war and the infinity Laplacian.", Journal of the American Mathematical Society, 22 (1): 167–210, arXiv:math/0605002v2, Bibcode:2009JAMS...22..167P, doi:10.1090/s0894-0347-08-00606-1, MR 2449057, S2CID 15472459.
