= Kumaraswamy distribution =

Family of continuous probability distributions

Kumaraswamy
- Probability density function

- Cumulative distribution function
- Parameters: $a>0\,$ (real) $b>0\,$ (real)
- Support: $x \in (0,1)\,$
- PDF: $abx^{a-1}(1-x^a)^{b-1}\,$
- CDF: $1-(1-x^a)^b$
- Quantile: $(1-(1-u)^\frac{1}{b})^\frac{1}{a}$
- Mean: $\frac{b\Gamma(1+\tfrac{1}{a})\Gamma(b)}{\Gamma(1+\tfrac{1}{a}+b)}\,$
- Median: $\left(1-2^{-1/b}\right)^{1/a}$
- Mode: $\left(\frac{a-1}{ab-1}\right)^{1/a}$ for $a\geq 1, b\geq 1, (a,b)\neq (1,1)$
- Variance: (complicated-see text)
- Skewness: (complicated-see text)
- Excess kurtosis: (complicated-see text)
- Entropy: $\left(1\!-\!\tfrac{1}{b}\right)+\left(1\!-\!\tfrac{1}{a}\right)H_b-\ln(ab)$

In probability and statistics, the Kumaraswamy's double bounded distribution is a family of continuous probability distributions defined on the interval (0,1). It is similar to the beta distribution, but much simpler to use especially in simulation studies since its probability density function, cumulative distribution function and quantile functions can be expressed in closed form. This distribution was originally proposed by Poondi Kumaraswamy for variables that are lower and upper bounded with a zero-inflation. In this first article of the distribution, the natural lower bound of zero for rainfall was modelled using a discrete probability, as rainfall in many places, especially in tropics, has significant nonzero probability. This discrete probability is now called zero-inflation. This was extended to inflations at both extremes [0,1] in the work of Fletcher and Ponnambalam. A good example for inflations at extremes are the probabilities of full and empty reservoirs and are important for reservoir design.

== Characterization ==
=== Probability density function ===
The probability density function of the Kumaraswamy distribution without considering any inflation is

$$f(x; a,b) = a b x^{a-1}{ (1-x^a)}^{b-1},  \ \ \mbox{where} \ \ x \in (0,1),$$

and where a and b are non-negative shape parameters.

=== Cumulative distribution function ===
The cumulative distribution function is

$$F(x; a,b)=\int_{0}^{x}f(\xi; a,b) d\xi = 1-(1-x^a)^b.\$$

=== Quantile function ===
The inverse cumulative distribution function (quantile function) is

$$F^{-1}(y; a,b)=(1-(1-y)^\frac{1}{b})^\frac{1}{a}. \$$

=== Generalizing to arbitrary interval support ===
In its simplest form, the distribution has a support of (0,1). In a more general form, the normalized variable x is replaced with the unshifted and unscaled variable z where:

$$x = \frac{z-z_{\text{min}}}{z_{\text{max}}-z_{\text{min}}} , \qquad z_{\text{min}} \le z \le z_{\text{max}}. \,\!$$

== Properties ==
The raw moments of the Kumaraswamy distribution are given by:

$$m_n = \frac{b\Gamma(1+n/a)\Gamma(b)}{\Gamma(1+b+n/a)} = bB(1+n/a,b)\,$$

where B is the Beta function and Γ(.) denotes the Gamma function. The variance, skewness, and excess kurtosis can be calculated from these raw moments. For example, the variance is:

$$\sigma^2=m_2-m_1^2.$$

The Shannon entropy (in nats) of the distribution is:

$$H=\left(1\!-\!\tfrac{1}{b}\right)+\left(1\!-\!\tfrac{1}{a}\right)H_b-\ln(ab)$$

where $H_i$ is the harmonic number function.

== Relation to the Beta distribution ==
The Kumaraswamy distribution is closely related to Beta distribution. Assume that X_{a,b} is a Kumaraswamy distributed random variable with parameters a and b. Then X_{a,b} is the a-th root of a suitably defined Beta distributed random variable. More formally, Let Y_{1,b} denote a Beta distributed random variable with parameters $\alpha=1$ and $\beta=b$. One has the following relation between X_{a,b} and Y_{1,b}.

$$X_{a,b}=Y^{1/a}_{1,b},$$

with equality in distribution.

$$\operatorname{P}\{X_{a,b}\le x\}=\int_0^x ab t^{a-1}(1-t^a)^{b-1}dt=
\int_0^{x^a} b(1-t)^{b-1}dt=\operatorname{P}\{Y_{1,b}\le x^a\}
=\operatorname{P}\{Y^{1/a}_{1,b}\le x\}
.$$

One may introduce generalised Kumaraswamy distributions by considering random variables of the form $Y^{1/\gamma}_{\alpha,\beta}$, with $\gamma>0$ and where $Y_{\alpha,\beta}$ denotes a Beta distributed random variable with parameters $\alpha$ and $\beta$. The raw moments of this generalized Kumaraswamy distribution are given by:

$$m_n = \frac{\Gamma(\alpha+\beta)\Gamma(\alpha+n/\gamma)}{\Gamma(\alpha)\Gamma(\alpha+\beta+n/\gamma)}.$$

Note that we can re-obtain the original moments setting $\alpha=1$, $\beta=b$ and $\gamma=a$. However, in general, the cumulative distribution function does not have a closed form solution.

== Related distributions ==
- If $X \sim \textrm{Kumaraswamy}(1,1)\,$ then $X \sim U(0,1)\,$ (Uniform distribution)
- If $X \sim U(0,1) \,$ then ${\left( 1-X^{\tfrac{1}{b}} \right)}^{ \tfrac{1}{a}} \sim \textrm{Kumaraswamy}(a,b) \,$
- If $X \sim \textrm{Beta}(1,b) \,$ (Beta distribution) then $X \sim \textrm{Kumaraswamy}(1,b)\,$
- If $X \sim \textrm{Beta}(a,1) \,$ (Beta distribution) then $X \sim \textrm{Kumaraswamy}(a,1)\,$
- If $X \sim \textrm{Kumaraswamy}(a,1)\,$ then $(1-X) \sim \textrm{Kumaraswamy}(1, a)\,$
- If $X \sim \textrm{Kumaraswamy}(1,a)\,$ then $(1-X) \sim \textrm{Kumaraswamy}(a, 1)\,$
- If $X \sim \textrm{Kumaraswamy}(a,1)\,$ then $-\log(X) \sim \textrm{Exponential}(a)\,$
- If $X \sim \textrm{Kumaraswamy}(1,b)\,$ then $-\log(1-X) \sim \textrm{Exponential}(b)\,$
- If $X \sim \textrm{Kumaraswamy}(a,b)\,$ then $X \sim \textrm{GB1}(a, 1, 1, b)\,$, the generalized beta distribution of the first kind
- If $X \sim \textrm{Kumaraswamy}(a,b)\,$ then $\left\{\frac{1}{1-X} \right\} \sim \textrm{MK}(a, b)\,$, the Modified Kumaraswamy distribution.

== Example ==
An example of the use of the Kumaraswamy distribution is the storage volume of a reservoir of capacity z whose upper bound is z_{max} and lower bound is 0, which is also a natural example for having two inflations as many reservoirs have nonzero probabilities for both empty and full reservoir states.
