= Wrapped exponential distribution =

Probability distribution

Wrapped Exponential
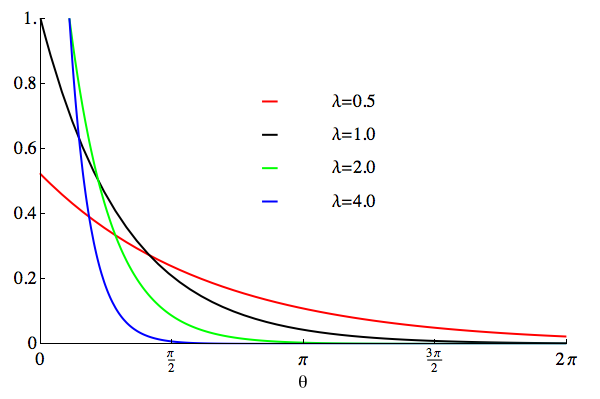
- Probability density function The support is chosen to be [0,2π]

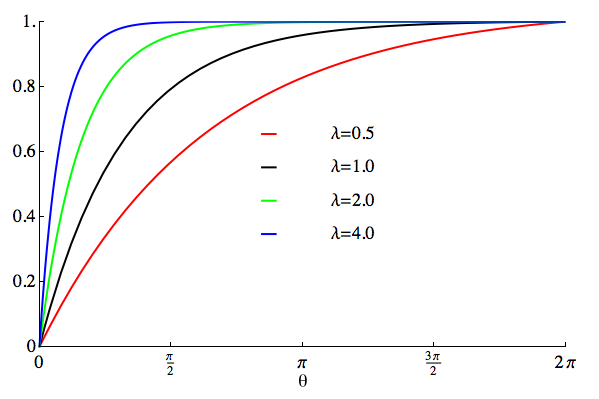
- Cumulative distribution function The support is chosen to be [0,2π]
- Parameters: $\lambda>0$
- Support: $0\le\theta<2\pi$
- PDF: $\frac{\lambda e^{-\lambda \theta}}{1-e^{-2\pi \lambda}}$
- CDF: $\frac{1-e^{-\lambda \theta}}{1-e^{-2\pi \lambda}}$
- Mean: $\arctan(1/\lambda)$ (circular)
- Variance: $1-\frac{\lambda}{\sqrt{1+\lambda^2}}$ (circular)
- Entropy: $1+\ln\left(\frac{\beta-1}{\lambda}\right)-\frac{\beta}{\beta-1}\ln(\beta)$ where $\beta=e^{2\pi\lambda}$ (differential)
- CF: $\frac{1}{1-in/\lambda}$

In probability theory and directional statistics, a wrapped exponential distribution is a wrapped probability distribution that results from the "wrapping" of the exponential distribution around the unit circle.

== Definition ==
The probability density function of the wrapped exponential distribution is

$$f_\text{WE}(\theta;\lambda)=\sum_{k=0}^\infty \lambda e^{-\lambda (\theta+2 \pi k)}=\frac{\lambda e^{-\lambda \theta}}{1-e^{-2\pi \lambda}} ,$$

for $0 \le \theta < 2\pi$ where $\lambda > 0$ is the rate parameter of the unwrapped distribution. This is identical to the truncated distribution obtained by restricting observed values X from the exponential distribution with rate parameter λ to the range $0\le X < 2\pi$. Note that this distribution is not periodic.

== Characteristic function ==
The characteristic function of the wrapped exponential is just the characteristic function of the exponential function evaluated at integer arguments:

$$\varphi_n(\lambda)=\frac{1}{1-in/\lambda}$$

which yields an alternate expression for the wrapped exponential PDF in terms of the circular variable z = e^{i(θ-m)} valid for all real θ and m:

$$\begin{align}
f_\text{WE}(z;\lambda)
& =\frac{1}{2\pi}\sum_{n=-\infty}^\infty \frac{z^{-n}}{1-in/\lambda}\\[10pt]
& =    \begin{cases}
\frac{\lambda}{\pi}\,\textrm{Im}(\Phi(z,1,-i\lambda))-\frac{1}{2\pi}
& \text{if }z \neq 1
\\[12pt]
\frac{\lambda}{1-e^{-2\pi\lambda}}
& \text{if }z=1
\end{cases}
\end{align}$$

where $\Phi()$ is the Lerch transcendent function.

== Circular moments ==
In terms of the circular variable $z=e^{i\theta}$ the circular moments of the wrapped exponential distribution are the characteristic function of the exponential distribution evaluated at integer arguments:

$$\langle z^n\rangle=\int_\Gamma e^{in\theta}\,f_\text{WE}(\theta;\lambda)\,d\theta = \frac{1}{1-in/\lambda} ,$$

where $\Gamma\,$ is some interval of length $2\pi$. The first moment is then the average value of z, also known as the mean resultant, or mean resultant vector:

$$\langle z \rangle=\frac{1}{1-i/\lambda} .$$

The mean angle is

$$\langle \theta \rangle=\mathrm{Arg}\langle z \rangle = \arctan(1/\lambda) ,$$

and the length of the mean resultant is

$$R=|\langle  z  \rangle| = \frac{\lambda}{\sqrt{1+\lambda^2}} .$$

and the variance is then 1 − R.

== Characterisation ==
The wrapped exponential distribution is the maximum entropy probability distribution for distributions restricted to the range $0\le \theta < 2\pi$ for a fixed value of the expectation $\operatorname{E}(\theta)$.

== See also ==
- Wrapped distribution
- Directional statistics
