= Hyperexponential =

Hyperexponential can refer to:

- The hyperexponential distribution in probability.
- Tetration, also known as hyperexponentiation.

== See also ==
- Double exponential function
