= Discrete phase-type distribution =

Type of probability distribution

The discrete phase-type distribution is a probability distribution that results from a system of one or more inter-related geometric distributions occurring in sequence, or phases. The sequence in which each of the phases occur may itself be a stochastic process. The distribution can be represented by a random variable describing the time until absorption of an absorbing Markov chain with one absorbing state. Each of the states of the Markov chain represents one of the phases.

It has continuous time equivalent in the phase-type distribution.

== Definition ==
A terminating Markov chain is a Markov chain where all states are transient, except one which is absorbing. Reordering the states, the transition probability matrix of a terminating Markov chain with $m$ transient states is

$${P}=\left[\begin{matrix}{T}&\mathbf{T}^0\\\mathbf{0}^\mathsf{T}&1\end{matrix}\right],$$

where ${T}$ is a $m\times m$ matrix, $\mathbf{T}^0$ and $\mathbf{0}$ are column vectors with $m$ entries, and $\mathbf{T}^0+{T}\mathbf{1}=\mathbf{1}$. The transition matrix is characterized entirely by its upper-left block ${T}$.

Definition. A distribution on $\{0,1,2,...\}$ is a discrete phase-type distribution if it is the distribution of the first passage time to the absorbing state of a terminating Markov chain with finitely many states.

== Characterization ==
Fix a terminating Markov chain. Denote ${T}$ the upper-left block of its transition matrix and $\tau$ the initial distribution. The distribution of the first time to the absorbing state is denoted $\mathrm{PH}_{d}(\boldsymbol{\tau},{T})$ or $\mathrm{DPH}(\boldsymbol{\tau},{T})$.

Its cumulative distribution function is

$$F(k)=1-\boldsymbol{\tau}{T}^{k}\mathbf{1},$$

for $k=1,2,...$, and its density function is

$$f(k)=\boldsymbol{\tau}{T}^{k-1}\mathbf{T^{0}},$$

for $k=1,2,...$. It is assumed the probability of process starting in the absorbing state is zero. The factorial moments of the distribution function are given by,

$$E[K(K-1)...(K-n+1)]=n!\boldsymbol{\tau}(I-{T})^{-n}{T}^{n-1}\mathbf{1},$$

where $I$ is the appropriate dimension identity matrix.

== Special cases ==
Just as the continuous time distribution is a generalisation of the exponential distribution, the discrete time distribution is a generalisation of the geometric distribution, for example:

- Degenerate distribution, point mass at zero or the empty phase-type distribution – 0 phases.
- Geometric distribution – 1 phase.
- Negative binomial distribution – 2 or more identical phases in sequence.
- Mixed Geometric distribution – 2 or more non-identical phases, that each have a probability of occurring in a mutually exclusive, or parallel, manner. This is the discrete analogue of the Hyperexponential distribution, but it is not called the Hypergeometric distribution, since that name is in use for an entirely different type of discrete distribution.

== See also ==
- Phase-type distribution
- Queueing model
- Queueing theory
