= Hyper-Erlang distribution =

Continuous probability distribution

Diagram showing queueing system equivalent of a hyper-Erlang distribution

In probability theory, a hyper-Erlang distribution is a continuous probability distribution which takes a particular Erlang distribution E_{i} with probability p_{i}. A hyper-Erlang distributed random variable X has a probability density function given by

$$A(x) = \sum_{i=1}^n p_i E_{l_i}(x)$$

where each p_{i} > 0 with the p_{i} summing to 1 and each of the E_{l_{i}} being an Erlang distribution with l_{i} stages each of which has parameter λ_{i}.

== See also ==
- Phase-type distribution
