= Phase-type distribution =

Probability distribution

Phase-type
- Parameters: $S,\; m\times m$ subgenerator matrix $\boldsymbol{\alpha}$, probability row vector
- Support: $x \in [0; \infty)\!$
- PDF: $\boldsymbol{\alpha}e^{xS}\boldsymbol{S}^{0}$ See article for details
- CDF: $1-\boldsymbol{\alpha}e^{xS}\boldsymbol{1}$
- Mean: $-\boldsymbol{\alpha}{S}^{-1}\mathbf{1}$
- Median: no simple closed form
- Mode: no simple closed form
- Variance: $2\boldsymbol{\alpha}{S}^{-2}\mathbf{1}-(\boldsymbol{\alpha}{S}^{-1}\mathbf{1})^{2}$
- MGF: $-\boldsymbol{\alpha}(tI+S)^{-1}\boldsymbol{S}^{0}+\alpha_{0}$
- CF: $-\boldsymbol{\alpha}(itI+S)^{-1}\boldsymbol{S}^{0}+\alpha_{0}$

A phase-type distribution is a probability distribution constructed by a convolution or mixture of exponential distributions. It results from a system of one or more inter-related Poisson processes occurring in sequence, or phases. The sequence in which each of the phases occurs may itself be a stochastic process. The distribution can be represented by a random variable describing the time until absorption of a Markov process with one absorbing state. Each of the states of the Markov process represents one of the phases.

It has a discrete-time equivalent – the discrete phase-type distribution.

The set of phase-type distributions is dense in the field of all positive-valued distributions, that is, it can be used to approximate any positive-valued distribution.

== Definition ==
Consider a continuous-time Markov process with m + 1 states, where m ≥ 1, such that the states 1,...,m are transient states and state 0 is an absorbing state. Further, let the process have an initial probability of starting in any of the m + 1 phases given by the probability vector (α_{0},α) where α_{0} is a scalar and α is a 1 × m vector.

The continuous phase-type distribution is the distribution of time from the above process's starting until absorption in the absorbing state.

This process can be written in the form of a transition rate matrix,

$${Q}=\left[\begin{matrix}0&\mathbf{0}\\\mathbf{S}^0&{S}\\\end{matrix}\right],$$

where S is an m × m matrix and S^{0} = –S1. Here 1 represents an m × 1 column vector with every element being 1.

== Characterization ==
The distribution of time X until the process reaches the absorbing state is said to be phase-type distributed and is denoted PH(α,S).

The distribution function of X is given by,

$$F(x)=1-\boldsymbol{\alpha}\exp({S}x)\mathbf{1},$$

and the density function,

$$f(x)=\boldsymbol{\alpha}\exp({S}x)\mathbf{S^{0}},$$

for all x > 0, where exp( · ) is the matrix exponential. It is usually assumed the probability of process starting in the absorbing state is zero (i.e. α_{0}= 0). The moments of the distribution function are given by

$$E[X^{n}]=(-1)^{n}n!\boldsymbol{\alpha}{S}^{-n}\mathbf{1}.$$

The Laplace transform of the phase type distribution is given by

$$M(s) = \alpha_0 + \boldsymbol{\alpha} (sI - S)^{-1} \mathbf{S^0},$$

where I is the identity matrix.

== Special cases ==
The following probability distributions are all considered special cases of a continuous phase-type distribution:

- Degenerate distribution, point mass at zero or the empty phase-type distribution – 0 phases.
- Exponential distribution – 1 phase.
- Erlang distribution – 2 or more identical phases in sequence.
- Deterministic distribution (or constant) – The limiting case of an Erlang distribution, as the number of phases become infinite, while the time in each state becomes zero.
- Coxian distribution – 2 or more (not necessarily identical) phases in sequence, with a probability of transitioning to the terminating/absorbing state after each phase.
- Hyperexponential distribution (also called a mixture of exponential) – 2 or more non-identical phases, that each have a probability of occurring in a mutually exclusive, or parallel, manner. (Note: The exponential distribution is the degenerate situation when all the parallel phases are identical.)
- Hypoexponential distribution – 2 or more phases in sequence, can be non-identical or a mixture of identical and non-identical phases, generalises the Erlang.

As the phase-type distribution is dense in the field of all positive-valued distributions, we can represent any positive valued distribution. However, the phase-type is a light-tailed or platykurtic distribution. So the representation of heavy-tailed or leptokurtic distribution by phase type is an approximation, even if the precision of the approximation can be as good as we want.

== Examples ==
In all the following examples it is assumed that there is no probability mass at zero, that is α_{0} = 0.

=== Exponential distribution ===
The simplest non-trivial example of a phase-type distribution is the exponential distribution of parameter λ. The parameter of the phase-type distribution are : S = -λ and α = 1.

=== Hyperexponential or mixture of exponential distribution ===
The mixture of exponential or hyperexponential distribution with λ_{1},λ_{2},...,λ_{n}>0 can be represented as a phase type distribution with

$$\boldsymbol{\alpha}=(\alpha_1,\alpha_2,\alpha_3,\alpha_4,...,\alpha_n)$$

with $\sum_{i=1}^n \alpha_i =1$ and

$${S}=\left[\begin{matrix}-\lambda_1&0&0&0&0\\0&-\lambda_2&0&0&0\\0&0&-\lambda_3&0&0\\0&0&0&-\lambda_4&0\\0&0&0&0&-\lambda_5\\\end{matrix}\right].$$

This mixture of densities of exponential distributed random variables can be characterized through

$$f(x)=\sum_{i=1}^n \alpha_i \lambda_i e^{-\lambda_i x} =\sum_{i=1}^n\alpha_i f_{X_i}(x),$$

or its cumulative distribution function

$$F(x)=1-\sum_{i=1}^n \alpha_i e^{-\lambda_i x}=\sum_{i=1}^n\alpha_iF_{X_i}(x).$$

with $X_i \sim Exp( \lambda_i )$

=== Erlang distribution ===
The Erlang distribution has two parameters, the shape an integer k > 0 and the rate λ > 0. This is sometimes denoted E(k,λ). The Erlang distribution can be written in the form of a phase-type distribution by making S a k×k matrix with diagonal elements -λ and super-diagonal elements λ, with the probability of starting in state 1 equal to 1. For example, E(5,λ),

$$\boldsymbol{\alpha}=(1,0,0,0,0),$$

and

$${S}=\left[\begin{matrix}-\lambda&\lambda&0&0&0\\0&-\lambda&\lambda&0&0\\0&0&-\lambda&\lambda&0\\0&0&0&-\lambda&\lambda\\0&0&0&0&-\lambda\\\end{matrix}\right].$$

For a given number of phases, the Erlang distribution is the phase type distribution with smallest coefficient of variation.

The hypoexponential distribution is a generalisation of the Erlang distribution by having different rates for each transition (the non-homogeneous case).

=== Mixture of Erlang distribution ===
The mixture of two Erlang distributions with parameter E(3,β_{1}), E(3,β_{2}) and (α_{1},α_{2}) (such that α_{1} + α_{2} = 1 and for each i, α_{i} ≥ 0) can be represented as a phase type distribution with

$$\boldsymbol{\alpha}=(\alpha_1,0,0,\alpha_2,0,0),$$

and

$${S}=\left[\begin{matrix}
-\beta_1&\beta_1&0&0&0&0\\
0&-\beta_1&\beta_1&0&0&0\\
0&0&-\beta_1&0&0&0\\
0&0&0&-\beta_2&\beta_2&0\\
0&0&0&0&-\beta_2&\beta_2\\
0&0&0&0&0&-\beta_2\\
\end{matrix}\right].$$

=== Coxian distribution ===
The Coxian distribution is a generalisation of the Erlang distribution. Instead of only being able to enter the absorbing state from state k it can be reached from any phase. The phase-type representation is given by,

$$S=\left[\begin{matrix}-\lambda_{1}&p_{1}\lambda_{1}&0&\dots&0&0\\
0&-\lambda_{2}&p_{2}\lambda_{2}&\ddots&0&0\\
\vdots&\ddots&\ddots&\ddots&\ddots&\vdots\\
0&0&\ddots&-\lambda_{k-2}&p_{k-2}\lambda_{k-2}&0\\
0&0&\dots&0&-\lambda_{k-1}&p_{k-1}\lambda_{k-1}\\
0&0&\dots&0&0&-\lambda_{k}
\end{matrix}\right]$$

and

$$\boldsymbol{\alpha}=(1,0,\dots,0),$$

where 0 < p_{1},...,p_{k-1} ≤ 1. In the case where all p_{i} = 1 we have the Erlang distribution. The Coxian distribution is extremely important as any acyclic phase-type distribution has an equivalent Coxian representation.

The generalised Coxian distribution relaxes the condition that requires starting in the first phase.

== Properties ==
=== Minima of Independent PH Random Variables ===
Similarly to the exponential distribution, the class of PH distributions is closed under minima of independent random variables. A description of this is here.

== Generating samples from phase-type distributed random variables ==
BuTools includes methods for generating samples from phase-type distributed random variables.

== Approximating other distributions ==
Any distribution can be arbitrarily well approximated by a phase type distribution. In practice, however, approximations can be poor when the size of the approximating process is fixed. Approximating a deterministic distribution of time 1 with 10 phases, each of average length 0.1 will have variance 0.1 (because the Erlang distribution has smallest variance).

- BuTools a MATLAB and Mathematica script for fitting phase-type distributions to 3 specified moments
- momentmatching a MATLAB script to fit a minimal phase-type distribution to 3 specified moments
- KPC-toolbox a library of MATLAB scripts to fit empirical datasets to Markovian arrival processes and phase-type distributions.

== Fitting a phase type distribution to data ==
Methods to fit a phase type distribution to data can be classified as maximum likelihood methods or moment matching methods. Fitting a phase type distribution to heavy-tailed distributions has been shown to be practical in some situations.

- PhFit a C script for fitting discrete and continuous phase type distributions to data
- EMpht is a C script for fitting phase-type distributions to data or parametric distributions using an expectation–maximization algorithm.
- HyperStar was developed around the core idea of making phase-type fitting simple and user-friendly, in order to advance the use of phase-type distributions in a wide range of areas. It provides a graphical user interface and yields good fitting results with only little user interaction.
- jPhase is a Java library which can also compute metrics for queues using the fitted phase type distribution

== See also ==
- Discrete phase-type distribution
- Continuous-time Markov process
- Exponential distribution
- Hyper-exponential distribution
- Queueing theory
