= Generalized beta distribution =

Probability distribution

In probability and statistics, the generalized beta distribution is a continuous probability distribution with four shape parameters, including more than thirty named distributions as limiting or special cases. A fifth parameter for scaling is sometimes included, while a sixth parameter for location is customarily left implicit and excluded from the characterization. The distribution has been used in the modeling of income distribution, stock returns, as well as in regression analysis. The exponential generalized beta (EGB) distribution follows directly from the GB and generalizes other common distributions.

== Definition ==
A generalized beta random variable, Y, is defined by the following probability density function (pdf):

$$GB(y;a,b,c,p,q) = \frac{|a|y^{ap-1}(1-(1-c)(y/b)^{a})^{q-1}}{b^{ap}B(p,q)(1+c(y/b)^{a})^{p+q}} \quad \quad \text{  for } 0<y^{a}< \frac{b^a}{1-c} ,$$

and zero otherwise. Here the parameters satisfy $a \ne 0$, $0 \le c \le 1$ and $b$, $p$, and $q$ positive. The function B(p,q) is the beta function. The parameter $b$ is the scale parameter and can thus be set to $1$ without loss of generality, but it is usually made explicit as in the function above. The location parameter (not included in the formula above) is usually left implicit and set to $0$.

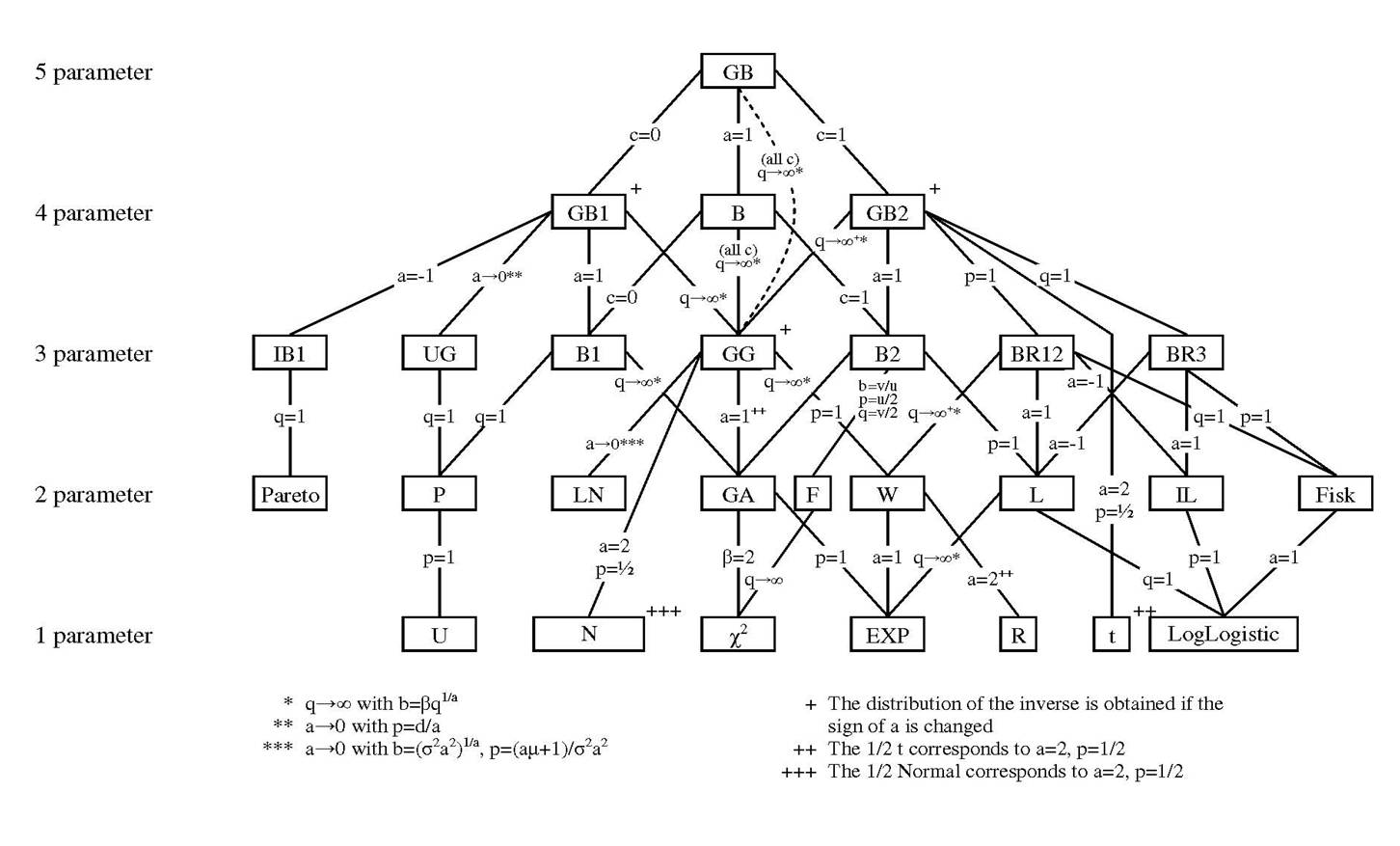
GB distribution tree

== Properties ==
=== Moments ===
It can be shown that the hth moment can be expressed as follows:

$$\operatorname{E}_{GB}(Y^{h})=\frac{b^{h}B(p+h/a,q)}{B(p,q)}{}_{2}F_{1} \begin{bmatrix}
p + h/a,h/a;c \\
p + q +h/a;
\end{bmatrix},$$

where ${}_{2}F_{1}$ denotes the hypergeometric series (which converges for all h if c < 1, or for all h / a < q if c = 1 ).

== Related distributions ==
The generalized beta encompasses many distributions as limiting or special cases. These are depicted in the GB distribution tree shown above. Listed below are its three direct descendants, or sub-families.

=== Generalized beta of first kind (GB1) ===
The generalized beta of the first kind is defined by the following pdf:

$$GB1(y;a,b,p,q) = \frac{|a|y^{ap-1}(1-(y/b)^{a})^{q-1}}{b^{ap}B(p,q)}$$

for $0< y^{a}<b^{a}$ where $b$, $p$, and $q$ are positive. It is easily verified that

$$GB1(y;a,b,p,q) = GB(y;a,b,c=0,p,q).$$

The moments of the GB1 are given by

$$\operatorname{E}_{GB1}(Y^{h}) = \frac{b^{h}B(p+h/a,q)}{B(p,q)}.$$

The GB1 includes the beta of the first kind (B1), generalized gamma (GG), and Pareto (PA) as special cases:

$$B1(y;b,p,q) = GB1(y;a=1,b,p,q) ,$$
$$GG(y;a,\beta,p) = \lim_{q \to \infty}
GB1(y;a,b=q^{1/a}\beta,p,q) ,$$
$$PA(y;b,p) = GB1(y;a=-1,b,p,q=1) .$$

=== Generalized beta of the second kind (GB2) ===
The GB2 is defined by the following pdf:

$$GB2(y;a,b,p,q) = \frac{|a|y^{ap-1}}{b^{ap}B(p,q)(1+(y/b)^a)^{p+q}}$$

for $0< y < \infty$ and zero otherwise. One can verify that

$$GB2(y;a,b,p,q) = GB(y;a,b,c=1,p,q).$$

The moments of the GB2 are given by

$$\operatorname{E}_{GB2}(Y^h) = \frac{b^h B(p+h/a,q-h/a)}{B(p,q)}.$$

The GB2 is also known as the Generalized Beta Prime (Patil, Boswell, Ratnaparkhi (1984)), the transformed beta (Venter, 1983), the generalized F (Kalfleisch and Prentice, 1980), and is a special case (μ≡0) of the Feller-Pareto (Arnold, 1983) distribution. The GB2 nests common distributions such as the generalized gamma (GG), Burr type 3, Burr type 12, Dagum, lognormal, Weibull, gamma, Lomax, F statistic, Fisk or Rayleigh, chi-square, half-normal, half-Student's t, exponential, asymmetric log-Laplace, log-Laplace, power function, and the log-logistic.

=== Beta ===
The beta family of distributions (B) is defined by:

$$B(y;b,c,p,q) = \frac{y^{p-1}(1-(1-c)(y/b))^{q-1}}{b^{p}B(p,q)(1+c(y/b))^{p+q}}$$

for $0<y<b/(1-c)$ and zero otherwise. Its relation to the GB is seen below:

$$B(y;b,c,p,q) = GB(y;a=1,b,c,p,q).$$

The beta family includes the beta of the first and second kind (B1 and B2, where the B2 is also referred to as the Beta prime), which correspond to c = 0 and c = 1, respectively. Setting $c = 0$, $b = 1$ yields the standard two-parameter beta distribution.

=== Generalized Gamma ===
The generalized gamma distribution (GG) is a limiting case of the GB2. Its PDF is defined by:

$$GG(y;a,\beta,p) = \lim_{q \rightarrow \infty} GB2(y,a,b=q^{1/a} \beta,p,q) = \frac{|a|y^{ap-1}e^{-(y/\beta)^{a}}}{\beta^{ap} \Gamma (p)}$$

with the $h$th moments given by

$$\operatorname{E}(Y_{GG}^h) = \frac{\beta^h \Gamma (p + h/a)}{\Gamma (p)}.$$

As noted earlier, the GB distribution family tree visually depicts the special and limiting cases (see McDonald and Xu (1995) ).

=== Pareto ===
The Pareto distribution (PA) is the following limiting case of the generalized gamma:

$$PA(y;\beta,\theta) = \lim_{a \rightarrow -\infty} GG(y;a,\beta,p=-\theta /a) = \lim_{a \rightarrow -\infty}\left(\frac{\theta y^{-\theta-1}e^{-(y/\beta)^{a}}}{\beta^{-\theta}(-\theta / a)\Gamma(-\theta / a)}\right) =$$
$\lim_{a \rightarrow -\infty}\left(\frac{\theta y^{-\theta - 1}e^{-(y/\beta)^{a}}}{\beta^{-\theta}\Gamma(1-\theta / a)} \right) = \frac{\theta y^{-\theta - 1}}{\beta^{-\theta}}$ for $\beta < y$ and $0$ otherwise.

=== Power function ===
The power function distribution (P) is the following limiting case of the generalized gamma:

$$P(y;\beta,\theta) = \lim_{a\rightarrow\infty}GG(y;a=\theta /p, \beta, p) = \lim_{a\rightarrow\infty}\frac{\mid\frac{\theta}{p}|y^{\theta-1}e^{-(y/\beta)^a}}{\beta^{\theta}\Gamma(p)} = \lim_{a\rightarrow\infty}\frac{\theta y^{\theta - 1}}{p\Gamma(p)\beta^{\theta}}e^{-(y/\beta)^{a}} =$$
$\lim_{a\rightarrow\infty}\frac{\theta y^{\theta - 1}}{\Gamma(p + 1)\beta^{\theta}}e^{-(y/\beta)^{a}} = \lim_{a\rightarrow\infty}\frac{\theta y^{\theta - 1}}{\Gamma(\frac{\theta}{a} + 1)\beta^{\theta}}e^{-(y/\beta)^{a}} = \frac{\theta y^{\theta - 1}}{\beta^{\theta}}$ for $0 < y < \beta$ and $\theta > 0$.

=== Asymmetric Log-Laplace ===
The asymmetric log-Laplace distribution (also referred to as the double Pareto distribution) is defined by:

$$ALL(y;b,\lambda_1,\lambda_2) = \lim_{a \rightarrow \infty} GB2(y;a,b,p = \lambda_1/a,q = \lambda_2/a) = \frac{\lambda_1\lambda_2}{y(\lambda_1+\lambda_2)}\begin{cases}
(\frac{y}{b})^{\lambda_1}  & \mbox{for } 0 < y < b \\
(\frac{b}{y})^{\lambda_2}  & \mbox{for } y \ge b
\end{cases}$$

where the $h$th moments are given by

$$\operatorname{E}(Y_{ALL}^h) = \frac{b^h \lambda_1 \lambda_2}{(\lambda_1 + h)(\lambda_2 - h)}.$$

When $\lambda_1 = \lambda_2$, this is equivalent to the log-Laplace distribution.

== Exponential generalized beta distribution ==
Letting $Y \sim GB(y;a,b,c,p,q)$ (without location parameter), the random variable $Z = \ln(Y)$, with re-parametrization $\delta = \ln(b)$ and $\sigma = 1/a$, is distributed as an exponential generalized beta (EGB), with the following pdf:

$$EGB(z;\delta,\sigma,c,p,q) = \frac{e^{p(z-\delta)/\sigma}(1-(1-c)e^{(z-\delta)/\sigma})^{q-1}}{|\sigma|B(p,q)(1+ce^{(z-\delta)/\sigma})^{p+q}}$$

for $-\infty < \frac{z-\delta}{\sigma}<\ln(\frac{1}{1-c})$, and zero otherwise. The EGB includes generalizations of the Gompertz, Gumbel, extreme value type I, logistic, Burr-2, exponential, and normal distributions. The parameter $\delta = \ln(b)$ is the location parameter of the EGB (while $b$ is the scale parameter of the GB), and $\sigma = 1/a$ is the scale parameter of the EGB (while $a$ is a shape parameter of the GB); The EGB has thus three shape parameters.

Included is a figure showing the relationship between the EGB and its special and limiting cases.

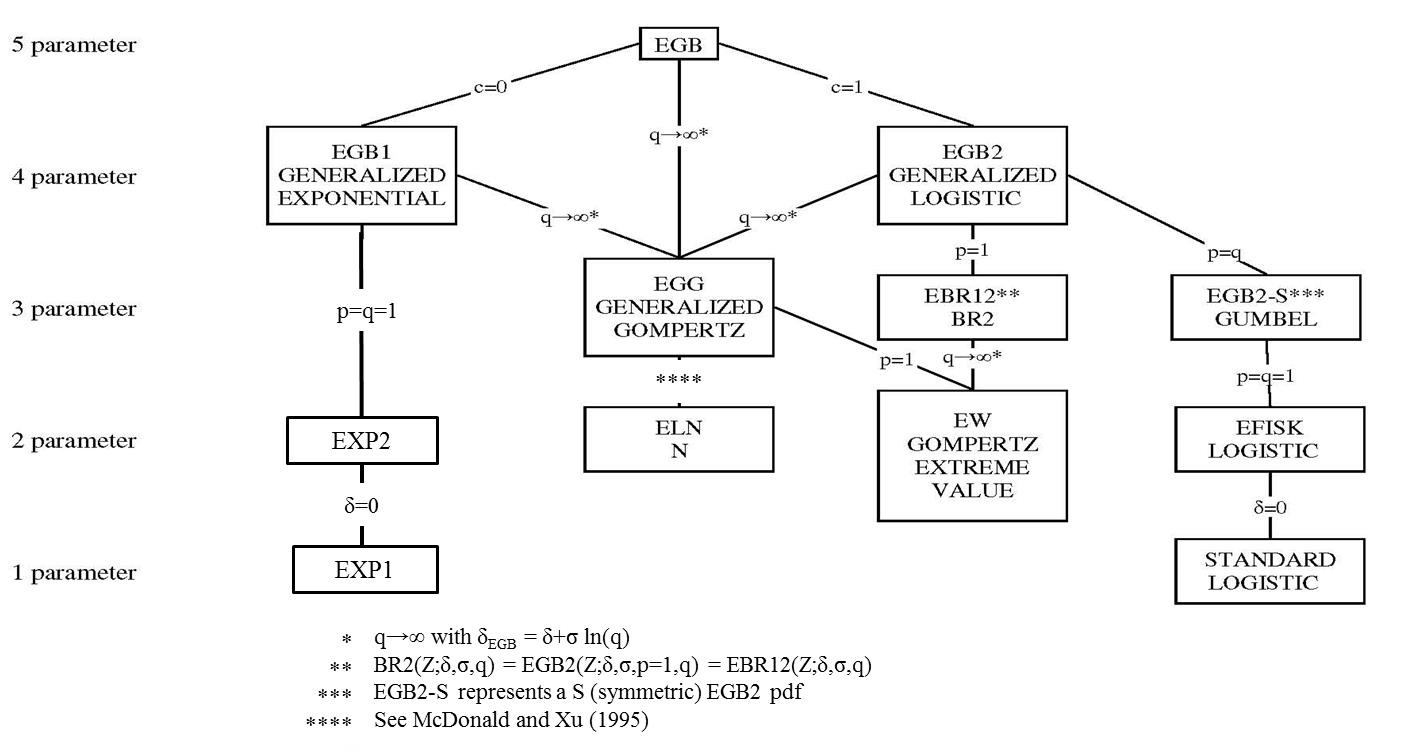
The EGB family of distributions

=== Moment generating function ===
Using similar notation as above, the moment-generating function of the EGB can be expressed as follows:

$$M_{EGB}(Z)=\frac{e^{\delta t}B(p+t\sigma,q)}{B(p,q)}{}_{2}F_{1} \begin{bmatrix}
p + t\sigma,t\sigma;c \\
p + q +t\sigma;
\end{bmatrix}.$$

== Multivariate generalized beta distribution ==
A multivariate generalized beta pdf extends the univariate distributions listed above. For $n$ variables $y = (y_1 , ... , y_n)$, define $1xn$ parameter vectors by $a = (a_1 , ... , a_n)$, $b = (b_1 , ... , b_n)$, $c = (c_1 , ... , c_n)$, and $p = (p_1 , ... , p_n)$ where each $b_i$ and $p_i$ is positive, and $0$ $\le$ $c_i$ $\le$ $1$. The parameter $q$ is assumed to be positive, and define the function $B(p_1, ... , p_n, q)$ = $\frac{\Gamma(p_1)...\Gamma(p_n)\Gamma(q)}{\Gamma(\bar{p}+q)}$ for $\bar{p}$ = $\sum_{i=1}^{n} p_i$.

The pdf of the multivariate generalized beta ($MGB$) may be written as follows:

$$MGB(y; a, b, p, q, c) = \frac{(\prod_{i=1}^{n} |a_i|y_i^{a_i p_i - 1})(1 - \sum_{i=1}^{n} (1-c_i)(\frac{y_i}{b_i})^{a_i})^{q - 1}}{(\prod_{i=1}^{n} b_i^{a_i p_i})B(p_1, ... , p_n, q)(1 + \sum_{i=1}^{n} c_i(\frac{y_i}{b_i})^{a_i})^{\bar{p} + q}}$$

where $0$ $<$ $\sum_{i=1}^{n} (1-c_i)(\frac{y_i}{b_i})^{a_i}$ $<$ $1$ for $0$ $\le$ $c_i$ $<$ $1$ and $0$ $<$ $y_i$ when $c_i$ = $1$.

Like the univariate generalized beta distribution, the multivariate generalized beta includes several distributions in its family as special cases. By imposing certain constraints on the parameter vectors, the following distributions can be easily derived.

=== Multivariate generalized beta of the first kind (MGB1) ===
When each $c_i$ is equal to 0, the MGB function simplifies to the multivariate generalized beta of the first kind (MGB1), which is defined by:

$$MGB1(y; a, b, p, q) = \frac{(\prod_{i=1}^{n} |a_i|y_i^{a_i p_i - 1})(1 - \sum_{i=1}^{n} (\frac{y_i}{b_i})^{a_i})^{q - 1}}{(\prod_{i=1}^{n} b_i^{a_i p_i})B(p_1, ... , p_n, q)}$$

where $0$ $<$ $\sum_{i=1}^{n} (\frac{y_i}{b_i})^{a_i}$ $<$ $1$.

=== Multivariate generalized beta of the second kind (MGB2) ===
In the case where each $c_i$ is equal to 1, the MGB simplifies to the multivariate generalized beta of the second kind (MGB2), with the pdf defined below:

$$MGB2(y; a, b, p, q) = \frac{(\prod_{i=1}^{n} |a_i|y_i^{a_i p_i - 1})}{(\prod_{i=1}^{n} b_i^{a_i p_i})B(p_1, ... , p_n, q)(1 + \sum_{i=1}^{n} (\frac{y_i}{b_i})^{a_i})^{\bar{p} + q}}$$

when $0$ $<$ $y_i$ for all $y_i$.

=== Multivariate generalized gamma ===
The multivariate generalized gamma (MGG) pdf can be derived from the MGB pdf by substituting $b_i$ = $\beta_i q ^ {\frac{1}{a_i}}$ and taking the limit as $q$ $\to$ $\infty$, with Stirling's approximation for the gamma function, yielding the following function:

$$MGG(y; a, \beta, p) = (\frac{(\prod_{i=1}^{n} |a_i|y_i^{a_i p_i - 1})}{(\prod_{i=1}^{n} \beta_i^{a_i p_i})\Gamma(p_i)})e^{- \sum_{i=1}^{n} (\frac{y_i}{\beta_i})^{a_i}} = \prod_{i=1}^{n} GG(y_i; a_i, \beta_i, p_i)$$

which is the product of independently but not necessarily identically distributed generalized gamma random variables.

=== Other multivariate distributions ===
Similar pdfs can be constructed for other variables in the family tree shown above, simply by placing an M in front of each pdf name and finding the appropriate limiting and special cases of the MGB as indicated by the constraints and limits of the univariate distribution. Additional multivariate pdfs in the literature include the Dirichlet distribution (standard form) given by $MGB1(y; a = 1, b = 1, p, q)$, the multivariate inverted beta and inverted Dirichlet (Dirichlet type 2) distribution given by $MGB2(y; a = 1, b = 1, p, q)$, and the multivariate Burr distribution given by $MGB2(y; a, b, p, q = 1)$.

=== Marginal density functions ===
The marginal density functions of the MGB1 and MGB2, respectively, are the generalized beta distributions of the first and second kind, and are given as follows:

$$GB1(y_i; a_i, b_i, p_i, \bar{p} - p_i + q) = \frac{|a_i|y_i^{a_i p_i - 1}(1 - (\frac{y_i}{b_i})^{a_i})^{\bar{p} - p_i + q - 1}}{b_i^{a_i p_i}B(p_i, \bar{p} - p_i + q)}$$

$$GB2(y_i; a_i, b_i, p_i, q) = \frac{|a_i|y_i^{a_i p_i - 1}}{b_i^{a_i p_i}B(p_i, q)(1 + (\frac{y_i}{b_i})^{a_i})^{p_i + q}}$$

== Applications ==
The flexibility provided by the GB family is used in modeling the distribution of:

- distribution of income
- hazard functions
- stock returns
- insurance losses

Applications involving members of the EGB family include:

- partially adaptive estimation of regression models
- time series models
- (G)ARCH models

=== Distribution of Income ===
The GB2 and several of its special and limiting cases have been widely used as models for the distribution of income. For some early examples see Thurow (1970), Dagum (1977), Singh and Maddala (1976), and McDonald (1984). Maximum likelihood estimations using individual, grouped, or top-coded data are easily performed with these distributions.

Measures of inequality, such as the Gini index (G), Pietra index (P), and Theil index (T) can be expressed in terms of the distributional parameters, as given by McDonald and Ransom (2008):

$$\begin{align} G=\left({\frac{1}{2\mu}}\right) \operatorname{E}(|Y-X|) = \left(P{\frac{1}{2\mu}}\right) \int_{0}^{\infty}\int_{0}^{\infty} |x-y|f(x)f(y)\,dx dy \\
= 1 - \frac{\int_{0}^{\infty} (1-F(y))^2\,dy}{\int_{0}^{\infty} (1-F(y))\,dy} \\
P = \left( \frac{1}{2\mu}\right) \operatorname{E} (|Y-\mu|) = \left(\frac{1}{2\mu}\right)\int_0^{\infty} |y-\mu|f(y)\, dy \\
T = \operatorname{E} (\ln (Y/\mu)^{Y/\mu}) = \int_0^ \infty (y/\mu) \ln (y/\mu) f(y)\, dy
\end{align}$$

=== Hazard Functions ===
The hazard function, h(s), where f(s) is a pdf and F(s) the corresponding cdf, is defined by

$$h(s) = \frac{f(s)}{1-F(s)}$$

Hazard functions are useful in many applications, such as modeling unemployment duration, the failure time of products or life expectancy. Taking a specific example, if s denotes the length of life, then h(s) is the rate of death at age s, given that an individual has lived up to age s. The shape of the hazard function for human mortality data might appear as follows: decreasing mortality in the first few months of life, then a period of relatively constant mortality and finally an increasing probability of death at older ages.

Special cases of the generalized beta distribution offer more flexibility in modeling the shape of the hazard function, which can call for "∪" or "∩" shapes or strictly increasing (denoted by I}) or decreasing (denoted by D) lines. The generalized gamma is "∪"-shaped for a>1 and p<1/a, "∩"-shaped for a<1 and p>1/a, I-shaped for a>1 and p>1/a and D-shaped for a<1 and p>1/a. This is summarized in the figure below.

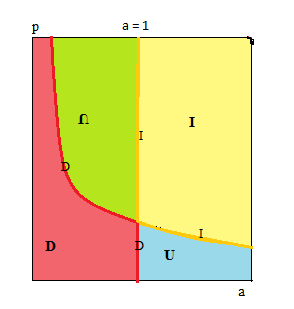
Possible hazard function shapes using the generalized gamma

== Bibliography ==
- C. Kleiber and S. Kotz (2003) Statistical Size Distributions in Economics and Actuarial Sciences. New York: Wiley
- Johnson, N. L., S. Kotz, and N. Balakrishnan (1994) Continuous Univariate Distributions. Vol. 2, Hoboken, NJ: Wiley-Interscience.
