= Champernowne distribution =

In statistics, the Champernowne distribution is a symmetric, continuous probability distribution, describing random variables that take both positive and negative values. It is a generalization of the logistic distribution that was introduced by D. G. Champernowne. Champernowne developed the distribution to describe the logarithm of income.

== Definition ==
The Champernowne distribution has a probability density function given by

$$f(y;\alpha, \lambda, y_0 ) = \frac{n}{\cosh[\alpha(y - y_0)] + \lambda}, \qquad -\infty < y < \infty,$$

where $\alpha, \lambda, y_0$ are positive parameters, and n is the normalizing constant, which depends on the parameters. The density may be rewritten as

$$f(y) = \frac{n}{\tfrac 1 2 e^{\alpha(y-y_0)} + \lambda + \tfrac 12 e^{-\alpha(y-y_0)}},$$

using the fact that $\cosh x = \tfrac 1 2 (e^x + e^{-x}).$

=== Properties ===
The density f(y) defines a symmetric distribution with median y_{0}, which has tails somewhat heavier than a normal distribution.

=== Special cases ===
In the special case $\lambda = 0$ ($\alpha = \tfrac \pi 2, y_0 = 0$) it is the hyperbolic secant distribution.

In the special case $\lambda=1$ it is the Burr Type XII density.

When $y_0 = 0, \alpha=1, \lambda=1$,

$$f(y) = \frac{1}{e^y + 2 + e^{-y}} = \frac{e^y}{(1+e^y)^2},$$

which is the density of the standard logistic distribution.

== Distribution of income ==
If the distribution of Y, the logarithm of income, has a Champernowne distribution, then the density function of the income X = exp(Y) is

$$f(x) = \frac{n}{x [1/2(x/x_0)^{-\alpha} + \lambda + a/2(x/x_0)^\alpha ]}, \qquad x > 0,$$

where x_{0} = exp(y_{0}) is the median income. If λ = 1, this distribution is often called the Fisk distribution, which has density

$$f(x) = \frac{\alpha x^{\alpha - 1}}{x_0^\alpha [1 + (x/x_0)^\alpha]^2}, \qquad x > 0.$$

== See also ==
- Generalized logistic distribution
