= Dagum distribution =

Probability distribution in economics

Dagum Distribution
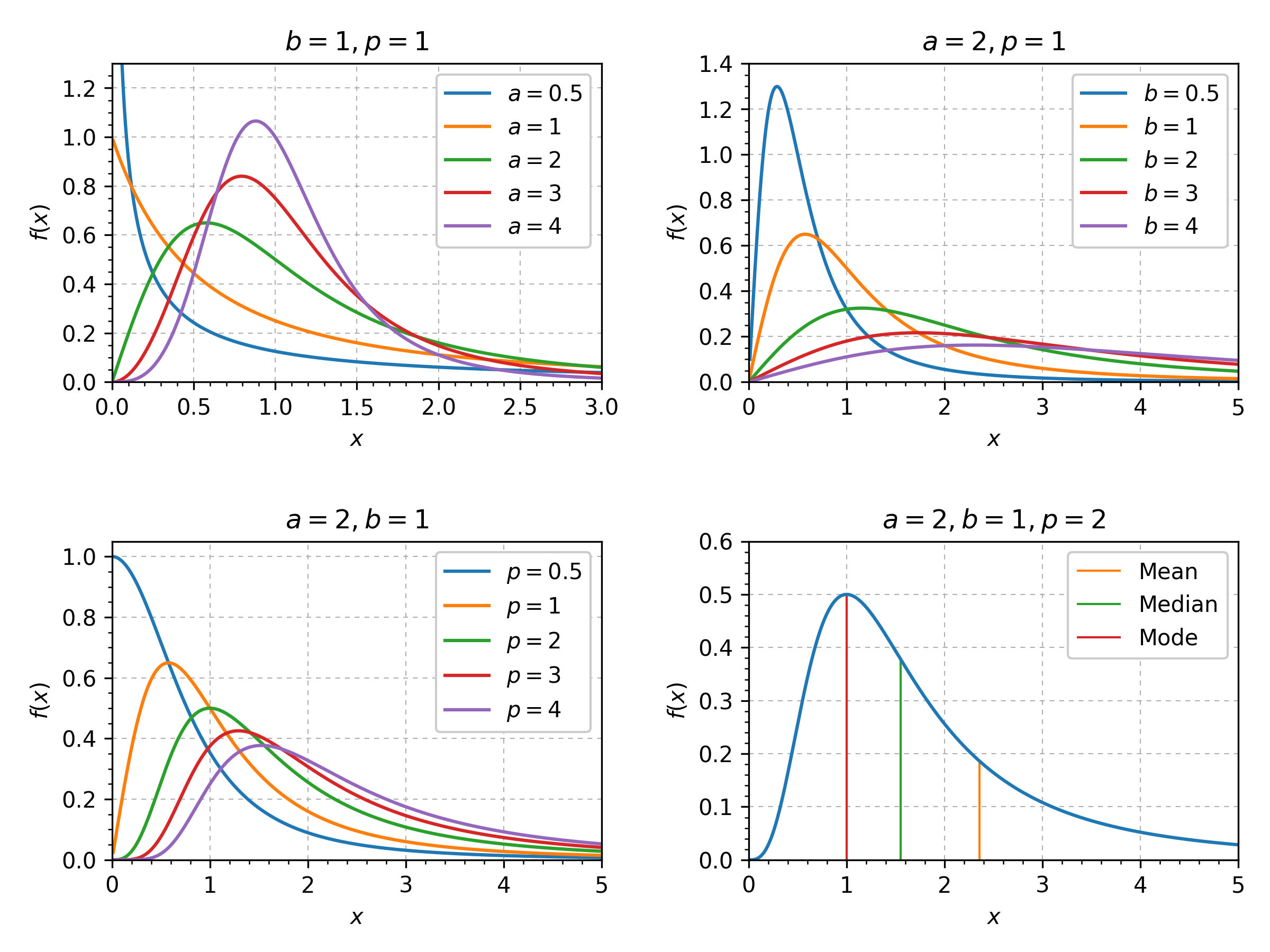
- Probability density function

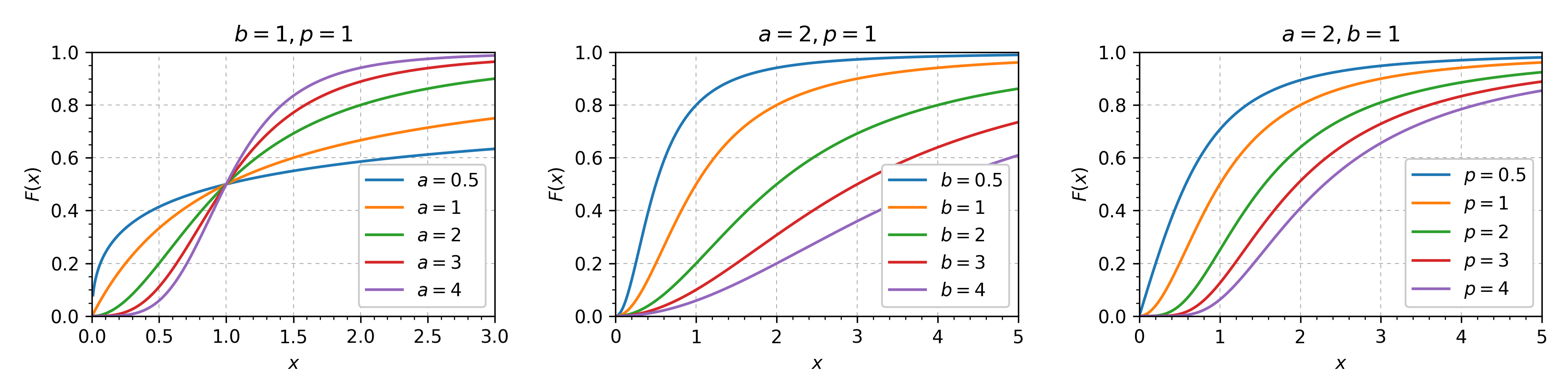
- Cumulative distribution function
- Parameters: $p>0$ shape $a>0$ shape $b > 0$ scale
- Support: $x>0$
- PDF: $\frac{a p}{b} \left( \frac{(\tfrac{x}{b})^{-a-1}}{\left((\tfrac{x}{b})^{-a} + 1 \right)^{p+1}} \right)$
- CDF: ${\left( 1+{\left(\frac{x}{b}\right)}^{-a} \right)}^{-p}$
- Quantile: $b(u^{-1/p}-1)^{-1/a}$
- Mean: $$\begin{cases} b\frac{\Gamma\left(1-\tfrac{1}{a}\right)\Gamma\left(p+\tfrac{1}{a}\right)}{\Gamma(p)} & \text{if}\ a>1    \\ \text{Indeterminate} & \text{otherwise}\ \end{cases}$$
- Median: $b{\left(-1+2^{\tfrac{1}{p}}\right)}^{-\tfrac{1}{a}}$
- Mode: $$\begin{cases} b{\left( \frac{ap-1}{a+1} \right)}^{\tfrac{1}{a}} & \text{if}\ ap>1    \\ \text{Indeterminate} & \text{otherwise}\ \end{cases}$$
- Variance: $$\begin{cases} {b^2} \left(\frac{\Gamma\left(1-\tfrac{2}{a}\right) \, \Gamma\left(p + \tfrac{2}{a} \right)}{\Gamma\left(p\right)} - \left( \frac{\Gamma\left(1 -\tfrac{1}{a}\right) \Gamma\left(p + \tfrac{1}{a}\right)}{\Gamma\left(p\right)} \right)^2\right) & \text{if}\ a>2    \\ \text{Indeterminate} & \text{otherwise}\ \end{cases}$$
- Entropy: $\ln\left(\frac{b}{ap}\right)+\frac{a+1}{a}H_{p-1}+\frac{p+1}{p}$ Where $H_{n}$ is the Harmonic numbers

The Dagum distribution (or Mielke Beta-Kappa distribution) is a continuous probability distribution defined over positive real numbers. It is named after Camilo Dagum, who proposed it in a series of papers in the 1970s. The Dagum distribution arose from several variants of a new model on the size distribution of personal income and is mostly associated with the study of income distribution. There is both a three-parameter specification (Type I) and a four-parameter specification (Type II) of the Dagum distribution; a summary of the genesis of this distribution can be found in "A Guide to the Dagum Distributions". A general source on statistical size distributions often cited in work using the Dagum distribution is Statistical Size Distributions in Economics and Actuarial Sciences.

== Definition ==
The cumulative distribution function of the Dagum distribution (Type I) is given by

$$F(x;a,b,p)= \left( 1+\left(\frac{x}{b}\right)^{-a} \right)^{-p} \text{ for } x > 0 \text{ where } a, b, p > 0 .$$

The corresponding probability density function is given by

$$f(x;a,b,p)= \frac{ap}{b} \left( \frac{(\tfrac{x}{b})^{-a-1}}{\left((\tfrac{x}{b})^{-a} + 1 \right)^{p+1}} \right) .$$

The quantile function is given by

$$Q(u;a,b,p)= b(u^{-1/p}-1)^{-1/a}=\frac{bu^{\frac{1}{pa}}}{\left(1-u^{\frac{1}{p}}\right)^\frac{1}{a}}$$

The Dagum distribution can be derived as a special case of the generalized Beta II (GB2) distribution (a generalization of the Beta prime distribution):

$$X \sim D(a,b,p) \iff X \sim GB2(a,b,p, 1)$$

There is also an intimate relationship between the Dagum and Singh–Maddala / Burr distribution.

$$X \sim D(a,b,p) \iff \frac{1}{X} \sim SM(a,\tfrac{1}{b},p)$$

The cumulative distribution function of the Dagum (Type II) distribution adds a point mass at the origin and then follows a Dagum (Type I) distribution over the rest of the support (i.e. over the positive halfline)

$$F(x;a,b,p,\delta)= \delta + (1-\delta) \left( 1+\left(\frac{x}{b}\right)^{-a} \right)^{-p}.$$

The quantile function of the Dagum (Type II) distribution is

$$Q(u;a,b,p,\delta)= b \left[\left(\frac{u-\delta}{1-\delta}\right)^{-\frac{1}{p}}-1\right]^{-\frac{1}{a}}.$$

== Use in economics ==
The Dagum distribution is often used to model income and wealth distribution. The relation between the Dagum Type I and the Gini coefficient is summarized in the formula below:

$$G=\frac{\Gamma (p) \Gamma (2p+1/a)}{\Gamma (2p) \Gamma (p+1/a)}-1 ,$$

where $\Gamma(\cdot)$ is the gamma function. Note that this value is independent from the scale-parameter, $b$.

Derivation of the Gini coefficient for the Dagum distribution

The Gini coefficient for a continuous probability distribution takes the form:

$$G = {1\over{\mu}}\int_{0}^{\infty}F(1-F)dx$$

where $F$ is the CDF of the distribution and $\mu$ is the expected value. For the Dagum distribution, assuming $a > 1$, the formula for the Gini coefficient becomes:

$$G = \frac{\Gamma(p)}{b \Gamma(1-1/a)\Gamma(p+1/a)}  \int_{0}^{\infty} \left[ 1 + \left( \frac{x}{b} \right)^{-a} \right]^{-p} \left\{ 1 - \left[ 1 + \left( \frac{x}{b} \right)^{-a} \right]^{-p} \right\} dx$$

Defining the substitution $u = (x/b)^{-a}$ leads to the simpler equation:

$$G = \frac{\Gamma(p)}{a \Gamma(1-1/a)\Gamma(p+1/a)}  \int_{0}^{\infty} u^{-1/a-1}\left( 1 + u \right)^{-p} \left[ 1 - \left( 1 + u \right)^{-p} \right] du$$

And making the substitution $z = u/(1+u)$ further changes the Gini coefficient formula to:

$$G = \frac{\Gamma(p)}{a \Gamma(1-1/a)\Gamma(p+1/a)}  \int_{0}^{1} z^{-1/a-1}\left( 1 - z \right)^{p + 1/a - 1} \left[ 1 - \left( 1 - z \right)^{p} \right] dz$$

Each of the integral components is equivalent to the standard beta function, which may be written in terms of the gamma function:

$$\text{B}(x,y) = {\Gamma(x)\Gamma(y)\over{\Gamma(x+y)}}$$

Then using this definition, and the fact that $a\Gamma(1-1/a) = -\Gamma(-1/a)$, the Gini coefficient may be written as:

$$\begin{aligned}
G &= \frac{\Gamma(p)}{ \Gamma(-1/a)\Gamma(p+1/a)} \left[ \frac{\Gamma(-1/a)\Gamma(2p+1/a)}{\Gamma(2p)} - \frac{\Gamma(-1/a)\Gamma(p+1/a)}{\Gamma(p)} \right] \\
&= \frac{\Gamma(p)\Gamma(2p+1/a)}{\Gamma(2p)\Gamma(p+1/a)} - 1
\end{aligned}$$

with the last term being the Gini coefficient for the Dagum distribution.

Although the Dagum distribution is not the only three-parameter distribution used to model income distribution, one study found it to usually be a better fit than other three-parameter models.

The Dagum distribution has been extended to model net wealth distribution, accounting for the observed frequencies of negative and null net wealth. This generalized model, known as the Dagum General Model of Net Wealth Distribution, is a mixture model consisting of an atomic distribution at zero (representing economic units with no wealth) with two continuous distributions for negative and positive net wealth.
