= Hyperbolic secant distribution =

Continuous probability distribution

hyperbolic secant
- Probability density function

- Cumulative distribution function
- Parameters: none
- Support: $x \in (-\infty; +\infty)\!$
- PDF: $\frac12 \; \operatorname{sech}\!\left(\frac{\pi}{2}\,x\right)\!$
- CDF: $\frac{2}{\pi} \arctan\!\left[\exp\!\left(\frac{\pi}{2}\,x\right)\right]\!$
- Quantile: $\frac{2}{\pi}\, \ln\!\left[\tan\left(\frac{\pi}{2}\,p\right)\right] \!$
- Mean: $0$
- Median: $0$
- Mode: $0$
- Variance: $1$
- Skewness: $0$
- Excess kurtosis: $2$
- Entropy: $\ln 4$
- MGF: $\sec(t)\!$ for $|t|<\frac{\pi}2\!$
- CF: $\operatorname{sech}(t)\!$ for $|t|<\frac{\pi}2\!$

In probability theory and statistics, the hyperbolic secant distribution is a continuous probability distribution whose probability density function and characteristic function are proportional to the hyperbolic secant function. The hyperbolic secant function is equivalent to the reciprocal hyperbolic cosine, and thus this distribution is also called the inverse-cosh distribution.

Generalisation of the distribution gives rise to the Meixner distribution, also known as the Natural Exponential Family - Generalised Hyperbolic Secant or NEF-GHS distribution.

== Definitions ==
=== Probability density function ===
A random variable follows a hyperbolic secant distribution if its probability density function can be related to the following standard form of density function by a location and shift transformation:

$$f(x) = \frac12 \operatorname{sech}\frac{\pi x}{2},$$

where "sech" denotes the hyperbolic secant function.

=== Cumulative distribution function ===
The cumulative distribution function (cdf) of the standard distribution is a scaled and shifted version of the Gudermannian function,

$$\begin{align}
F(x) &= \frac12 + {\frac{1}{\pi} \arctan} \Bigl({\operatorname{sinh}\frac{\pi x}2}\Bigr) \\[8mu]
&= {\frac{2}{\pi} \arctan}\Bigl({\exp\frac{\pi x}2} \Bigr) .
\end{align}$$

where "arctan" is the inverse (circular) tangent function.

Johnson et al. (1995) places this distribution in the context of a class of generalized forms of the logistic distribution, but use a different parameterisation of the standard distribution compared to that here. Ding (2014) shows three occurrences of the Hyperbolic secant distribution in statistical modeling and inference.

== Properties ==
The hyperbolic secant distribution shares many properties with the standard normal distribution: it is symmetric with unit variance and zero mean, median and mode, and its probability density function is proportional to its characteristic function. However, the hyperbolic secant distribution is leptokurtic; that is, it has a more acute peak near its mean, and heavier tails, compared with the standard normal distribution. Both the hyperbolic secant distribution and the logistic distribution are special cases of the Champernowne distribution, which has exponential tails.

The inverse cdf (or quantile function) for a uniform variate 0 ≤ p < 1 is

$$F^{-1}(p) = -\frac{2}{\pi}\, \operatorname{arsinh}\!\left[\cot(\pi\,p)\right] \! ,$$
$$= \frac{2}{\pi}\, \ln\!\left[\tan\left(\frac{\pi}{2}\,p\right)\right] \! .$$

where "arsinh" is the inverse hyperbolic sine function and "cot" is the (circular) cotangent function.

== Generalisations ==
=== Convolution ===
Considering the (scaled) sum of $r$ independent and identically distributed hyperbolic secant random variables:

$$X = \frac{1}{\sqrt{r}}\; (X_1 + X_2 + \;...\; + X_r)$$

then in the limit $r\to\infty$ the distribution of $X$ will tend to the normal distribution $N(0,1)$, in accordance with the central limit theorem.

This allows a convenient family of distributions to be defined with properties intermediate between the hyperbolic secant and the normal distribution, controlled by the shape parameter $r$, which can be extended to non-integer values via the characteristic function

$$\varphi(t) = \big(\operatorname{sech}(t /\sqrt{r})\big)^r$$

Moments can be readily calculated from the characteristic function. The excess kurtosis is found to be $2/r$.

=== Location and scale ===
The distribution (and its generalisations) can also trivially be shifted and scaled in the usual way to give a corresponding location-scale family:

$$f(x) = \frac{1}{2 \sigma} \operatorname{sech} \left(\frac{\pi}{2}\frac{x-\mu}{\sigma}\right)$$

=== Skew ===
A skewed form of the distribution can be obtained by multiplying by the exponential $e^{\theta x}, |{\theta}|<{\pi}/2$ and normalising, to give the distribution

$$f(x) = \cos \theta \; \frac{e^{\theta x}}{2 \operatorname{cosh}(\frac{\pi x}{2})}$$

where the parameter value $\theta = 0$ corresponds to the original distribution.

=== Kurtosis ===
The Champernowne distribution has an additional parameter to shape the core or wings.

=== Meixner distribution ===
Allowing all four of the adjustments above gives distribution with four parameters, controlling shape, skew, location, and scale respectively, called either the Meixner distribution after Josef Meixner who first investigated the family, or the NEF-GHS distribution (Natural exponential family - Generalised Hyperbolic Secant distribution).

In financial mathematics the Meixner distribution has been used to model non-Gaussian movement of stock-prices, with applications including the pricing of options.

=== Related distribution ===
Losev (1989) has studied independently the asymmetric (skewed) curve $h(x)=\frac{1}{\exp(-a x) + \exp(b x)}$, which uses just two parameters $a, b$. In it, $a$ is a measure of left skew and $b$ a measure of right skew, in case the parameters are both positive. They have to be both positive or negative, with $a = b$ being the hyperbolic secant - and therefore symmetric - and $h(x)^r$ being its further reshaped form.

The normalising constant is as follows:

$$\frac{a+b}{\pi}\sin\left(\frac{b \pi}{a+b}\right)$$

which reduces to $\frac{2a}{\pi}$ for the symmetric version.

Furthermore, for the symmetric version, $a$ can be estimated as $a=\frac{\pi}{2\sigma}$.
