= Irving W. Burr =

American statistician (1908-1989)

- Born: April 9, 1908
- Died: March 13, 1989 (aged 80)
- Education: Antioch College; University of Chicago; University of Michigan
- Employer: Purdue University

Irving Wingate Burr (April 9, 1908 - March 13, 1989) was an American statistician specializing in statistical quality control and industrial statistics. He was a fellow of the American Statistical Association and the Institute of Mathematical Statistics. He was a recipient of the Shewhart Medal. The Burr distributions are named after him.

== Education ==
Burr earned his BS from Antioch College (1930), his MS from the University of Chicago (1935) and his PhD from the University of Michigan (1941). His MS thesis was titled The Abelian Integrals Associated with a Special Algebraic Function. Burr's PhD thesis, written under the tutelage of Harry C. Carver, was titled Cumulative Frequency Functions.

== Career ==
In 1941, Burr joined the Department of Statistics at Purdue University and stayed there until his retirement in 1974. He was chair of the department from 1962 to 1964. His academic work centered on statistical process control and the theory of statistical distributions. The Burr distributions are named after him.

== Professional acknowledgement ==
Burr was elected a Fellow of the American Statistical Association and of the Institute of Mathematical Statistics. In 1950, he was awarded the Brumbaugh Award by the American Society for Quality Control (now the American Society for Quality) for his series of articles in Industrial Quality Control titled A New Method for Approving a Machine or Process Setting and for his article with Wade R. Weaver in the same journal titled Stratification Control Charts. In 1959, the American Society for Quality Control awarded him the Shewhart Medal.

== Personal life ==
Burr was an accomplished amateur ornithologist.

== Selected publications ==
=== Books ===
- Burr, Irving W. (1953). Engineering Statistics and Quality Control. United Kingdom: McGraw-Hill.
- Burr, Irving W. (1974). Applied statistical methods. New York: Academic Press. ISBN 978-0-12-146150-8.
- Burr, Irving W. (1976). Statistical quality control methods. New York: M. Dekker. ISBN 978-0-8247-6344-2.
- Burr, Irving W. (1979). Elementary statistical quality control. New York: M. Dekker. ISBN 978-0-8247-6686-3.

=== Journal articles ===
- Burr, Irving W. (1942). "Cumulative Frequency Functions" (PDF). The Annals of Mathematical Statistics. 13 (2): 215–232. doi:10.1214/aoms/1177731607. ISSN 0003-4851.
- Burr, Irving W. (1950). "Statistics for Engineers at Purdue". The American Statistician. 4 (4): 19. doi:10.1080/00031305.1950.10501651. ISSN 0003-1305.
- Burr, Irving W. (1951). "What Principles and Applications of Statistics Should Be Taught in High School and Junior College?". The Mathematics Teacher. 44 (1): 10–12. doi:10.5951/MT.44.1.0010. ISSN 0025-5769.
- Burr, Irving W. (1954). "Use of Experiments in Teaching Engineering Statistics". Journal of the American Statistical Association. 49 (268): 897–905. doi:10.1080/01621459.1954.10501243. ISSN 0162-1459.
- Burr, Irving W. (1955). "Calculation of Exact Sampling Distribution of Ranges from a Discrete Population" (PDF). The Annals of Mathematical Statistics. 26 (3): 530–532. doi:10.1214/aoms/1177728500. ISSN 0003-4851.
- Burr, Irving W. (1967). "A Useful Approximation to the Normal Distribution Function, with Application to Simulation". Technometrics. 9 (4): 647–651. doi:10.1080/00401706.1967.10490512.
- Burr, Irving W.; Cislak, Peter J. (1968). "On A General System of Distributions I. Its Curve-Shape Characteristics II. The Sample Median". Journal of the American Statistical Association. 63 (322): 627–635. doi:10.1080/01621459.1968.11009281. ISSN 0162-1459.
- Burr, Irving W. (1968). "On A General System of Distributions III. The Sample Range". Journal of the American Statistical Association. 63 (322): 636–643. doi:10.1080/01621459.1968.11009282. ISSN 0162-1459.
- Burr, Irving W. (1969). "Control Charts for Measurements with Varying Sample Sizes". Journal of Quality Technology. 1 (3): 163–167. doi:10.1080/00224065.1969.11980368. ISSN 0022-4065.
- Burr, Irving W. (1969). "Control Charts for Measurements with Varying Sample Sizes". Journal of Quality Technology. 1 (3): 163–167. doi:10.1080/00224065.1969.11980368.
- Burr, Irving W. (1970). "The Quality Control Chart Technique". Journal of Quality Technology. 2 (4): 246–247. doi:10.1080/00224065.1970.11980444.
- Burr, Irving W. (1973). "Pameters for a general system of distributions to match a grid of a_{3}and a_{4}". Communications in Statistics. 2: 1–21. doi:10.1080/03610927308827052.
- Burr, Irving W. (1973). "Some approximate relations between terms of the hypergeometric, binomial and poisson distributions". Communications in Statistics. 1 (4): 297–301. doi:10.1080/03610927308827027.
