= Half-logistic distribution =

Concept in statistics

- Probability density function

- Cumulative distribution function
- Support: $k \in [0;\infty)\!$
- PDF: $\frac{2 e^{-k}}{(1+e^{-k})^2}\!$
- CDF: $\frac{1-e^{-k}}{1+e^{-k}}\!$
- Mean: $\ln(4)=1.386\ldots$
- Median: $\ln(3)=1.0986\ldots$
- Mode: 0
- Variance: $\pi^2/3-(\ln(4))^2=1.368\ldots$
- Entropy: $\log\left(\frac{e^{2}}{2}\right)$

In probability theory and statistics, the half-logistic distribution is a continuous probability distribution—the distribution of the absolute value of a random variable following the logistic distribution. That is, for

$$X = |Y| \!$$

where Y is a logistic random variable, X is a half-logistic random variable.

== Specification ==
=== Cumulative distribution function ===
The cumulative distribution function (cdf) of the half-logistic distribution is intimately related to the cdf of the logistic distribution. Formally, if F(k) is the cdf for the logistic distribution, then G(k) = 2F(k) − 1 is the cdf of a half-logistic distribution. Specifically,

$$G(k) = \frac{1-e^{-k}}{1+e^{-k}} \text{ for } k\geq 0. \!$$

=== Probability density function ===
Similarly, the probability density function (pdf) of the half-logistic distribution is g(k) = 2f(k) if f(k) is the pdf of the logistic distribution. Explicitly,

$$g(k) = \frac{2 e^{-k}}{(1+e^{-k})^2} \text{ for } k\geq 0. \!$$
