= Beta prime distribution =

Probability distribution

Beta prime
- Probability density function

- Cumulative distribution function
- Parameters: $\alpha > 0$ shape (real) $\beta > 0$ shape (real)
- Support: $x \in [0,\infty)\!$
- PDF: $f(x) = \frac{x^{\alpha-1} (1+x)^{-\alpha -\beta}}{\Beta(\alpha,\beta)}\!$
- CDF: $I_{\frac{x}{1+x}(\alpha,\beta) }$ where $I_x(\alpha,\beta)$ is the regularized incomplete beta function
- Mean: $\frac{\alpha}{\beta-1}$ if $\beta>1$
- Mode: $\frac{\alpha-1}{\beta+1} \text{ if } \alpha\ge 1\text{, 0 otherwise}\!$
- Variance: $\frac{\alpha(\alpha+\beta-1)}{(\beta-2)(\beta-1)^2}$ if $\beta>2$
- Skewness: $\frac{2(2\alpha+\beta-1)}{\beta-3}\sqrt{\frac{\beta-2}{\alpha(\alpha+\beta-1)}}$ if $\beta>3$
- Excess kurtosis: $6\frac{\alpha(\alpha+\beta-1)(5\beta-11) + (\beta-1)^2(\beta-2)}{\alpha(\alpha+\beta-1)(\beta-3)(\beta-4) }$ if $\beta>4$
- Entropy: $$\begin{align}&\log\left(\Beta(\alpha,\beta)\right) + (\alpha-1)(\psi(\beta)-\psi(\alpha)) \\ +&(\alpha+\beta) \left(\psi(1-\alpha-\beta) -  \psi(1-\beta) + \frac{\pi \sin(\alpha \pi)}{\sin(\beta \pi)\sin((\alpha+\beta)\pi))} \right)  \end{align}$$ where $\psi$ is the digamma function.
- MGF: Does not exist
- CF: $$\frac{e^{-it}\Gamma(\alpha+\beta)}{\Gamma(\beta)}G_{1,2}^{\,2,0}\!\left(\left.{\begin{matrix}\alpha+\beta\\\beta,0\end{matrix}}\;\right|\,-it\right)$$

In probability theory and statistics, the beta prime distribution (also known as inverted beta distribution or beta distribution of the second kind) is an absolutely continuous probability distribution. If $p\in[0,1]$ has a beta distribution, then the odds $\frac{p}{1-p}$ has a beta prime distribution.

== Definitions ==
Beta prime distribution is defined for $x > 0$ with two parameters α and β, having the probability density function:

$$f(x) = \frac{x^{\alpha-1} (1+x)^{-\alpha -\beta}}{\Beta(\alpha,\beta)}$$

where B is the Beta function.

The cumulative distribution function is

$$F(x; \alpha,\beta)=I_{\frac{x}{1+x}}\left(\alpha, \beta \right) ,$$

where I is the regularized incomplete beta function.

While the related beta distribution is the conjugate prior distribution of the parameter of a Bernoulli distribution expressed as a probability, the beta prime distribution is the conjugate prior distribution of the parameter of a Bernoulli distribution expressed in odds. The distribution is a Pearson type VI distribution.

The mode of a variate X distributed as $\beta'(\alpha,\beta)$ is $\hat{X} = \frac{\alpha-1}{\beta+1}$. Its mean is $\frac{\alpha}{\beta-1}$ if $\beta>1$ (if $\beta \leq 1$ the mean is infinite, in other words it has no well defined mean) and its variance is $\frac{\alpha(\alpha+\beta-1)}{(\beta-2)(\beta-1)^2}$ if $\beta>2$.

For $-\alpha <k <\beta$, the k-th moment $E[X^k]$ is given by

$$E[X^k]=\frac{\Beta(\alpha+k,\beta-k)}{\Beta(\alpha,\beta)}.$$

For $k\in \mathbb{N}$ with $k <\beta,$ this simplifies to

$$E[X^k]=\prod_{i=1}^k \frac{\alpha+i-1}{\beta-i}.$$

The cdf can also be written as

$$\frac{x^\alpha \cdot {}_2F_1(\alpha, \alpha+\beta, \alpha+1, -x)}{\alpha \cdot \Beta(\alpha,\beta)}$$

where ${}_2F_1$ is the Gauss's hypergeometric function _{2}F_{1} .

=== Alternative parameterization ===
The beta prime distribution may also be reparameterized in terms of its mean μ > 0 and precision ν > 0 parameters ( p. 36).

Consider the parameterization μ = α/(β − 1) and ν = β − 2, i.e., α = μ(1 + ν) and β = 2 + ν. Under this parameterization E[Y] = μ and Var[Y] = μ(1 + μ)/ν.

=== Generalization ===
Two more parameters can be added to form the generalized beta prime distribution $\beta'(\alpha,\beta,p,q)$:

- $p > 0$ shape (real)
- $q > 0$ scale (real)

having the probability density function:

$$f(x;\alpha,\beta,p,q) = \frac{p \left(\frac x q \right)^{\alpha p-1} \left(1+ \left(\frac x q \right)^p\right)^{-\alpha -\beta}}{q \Beta(\alpha,\beta)}$$

with mean

$$\frac{q\Gamma\left(\alpha+\tfrac 1 p\right)\Gamma(\beta-\tfrac 1 p)}{\Gamma(\alpha)\Gamma(\beta)} \quad \text{if } \beta p>1$$

and mode

$$q \left({\frac{\alpha p -1}{\beta p +1}}\right)^\tfrac{1}{p} \quad \text{if } \alpha p\ge 1$$

Note that if p = q = 1 then the generalized beta prime distribution reduces to the standard beta prime distribution.

This generalization can be obtained via the following invertible transformation. If $y\sim\beta'(\alpha,\beta)$ and $x=qy^{1/p}$ for $q,p>0$, then $x\sim\beta'(\alpha,\beta,p,q)$.

==== Compound gamma distribution ====
The compound gamma distribution is the generalization of the beta prime when the scale parameter, q is added, but where p = 1. It is so named because it is formed by compounding two gamma distributions:

$$\beta'(x;\alpha,\beta,1,q) = \int_0^\infty G(x;\alpha,r)G(r;\beta,q) \; dr$$

where $G(x;a,b)$ is the gamma pdf with shape $a$ and inverse scale $b$.

The mode, mean and variance of the compound gamma can be obtained by multiplying the mode and mean in the above infobox by q and the variance by q^{2}.

Another way to express the compounding is if $r\sim G(\beta,q)$ and $x\mid r\sim G(\alpha,r)$, then $x\sim\beta'(\alpha,\beta,1,q)$. This gives one way to generate random variates with compound gamma, or beta prime distributions. Another is via the ratio of independent gamma variates, as shown below.

== Properties ==
- If $X \sim \beta'(\alpha,\beta)$ then $\tfrac{1}{X} \sim \beta'(\beta,\alpha)$.
- If $Y\sim\beta'(\alpha,\beta)$, and $X=qY^{1/p}$, then $X\sim\beta'(\alpha,\beta,p,q)$.
- If $X \sim \beta'(\alpha,\beta,p,q)$ then $kX \sim \beta'(\alpha,\beta,p,kq)$.
- $\beta'(\alpha,\beta,1,1) = \beta'(\alpha,\beta)$

== Related distributions ==
- If $X \sim \textrm{Beta}(\alpha,\beta)$, then $\frac{X}{1-X} \sim \beta'(\alpha,\beta)$ and $\frac{1}{X}-1 \sim \beta'(\beta,\alpha)$. This property can be used to generate beta prime distributed variates.
- If $X \sim \beta'(\alpha,\beta)$, then $\frac{X}{1+X} \sim \textrm{Beta}(\alpha,\beta)$ and $\frac{1}{X+1} \sim \textrm{Beta}(\beta,\alpha)$. This is a corollary from the property above.
- If $X \sim F(2\alpha,2\beta)$ has an F-distribution, then $\tfrac{\alpha}{\beta} X \sim \beta'(\alpha,\beta)$, or equivalently, $X\sim\beta'(\alpha,\beta , 1 , \tfrac{\beta}{\alpha})$.
- For gamma distribution parametrization I:
  - If $X_k \sim \Gamma(\alpha_k,\theta_k)$ are independent, then $\tfrac{X_1}{X_2} \sim \beta'(\alpha_1,\alpha_2,1,\tfrac{\theta_1}{\theta_2})$. Note $\theta_1,\theta_2,\tfrac{\theta_1}{\theta_2}$ are all scale parameters for their respective distributions.
- For gamma distribution parametrization II:
  - If $X_k \sim \Gamma(\alpha_k,\beta_k)$ are independent, then $\tfrac{X_1}{X_2} \sim \beta'(\alpha_1,\alpha_2,1,\tfrac{\beta_2}{\beta_1})$. The $\beta_k$ are rate parameters, while $\tfrac{\beta_2}{\beta_1}$ is a scale parameter.
  - If $\beta_2\sim \Gamma(\alpha_1,\beta_1)$ and $X_2\mid\beta_2\sim\Gamma(\alpha_2,\beta_2)$, then $X_2\sim\beta'(\alpha_2,\alpha_1,1,\beta_1)$. The $\beta_k$ are rate parameters for the gamma distributions, but $\beta_1$ is the scale parameter for the beta prime.
- $\beta'(p,1,a,b) = \textrm{Dagum}(p,a,b)$ the Dagum distribution
- $\beta'(1,p,a,b) = \textrm{SinghMaddala}(p,a,b)$ the Singh–Maddala distribution.
- $\beta'(1,1,\gamma,\sigma) = \textrm{LL}(\gamma,\sigma)$ the log logistic distribution.
- The beta prime distribution is a special case of the type 6 Pearson distribution.
- If X has a Pareto distribution with minimum $x_m$ and shape parameter $\alpha$, then $\dfrac{X}{x_m}-1\sim\beta^\prime(1,\alpha)$.
- If X has a Lomax distribution, also known as a Pareto Type II distribution, with shape parameter $\alpha$ and scale parameter $\lambda$, then $\frac{X}{\lambda}\sim \beta^\prime(1,\alpha)$.
- If X has a standard Pareto Type IV distribution with shape parameter $\alpha$ and inequality parameter $\gamma$, then $X^{\frac{1}{\gamma}} \sim \beta^\prime(1,\alpha)$, or equivalently, $X \sim \beta^\prime(1,\alpha,\tfrac{1}{\gamma},1)$.
- The inverted Dirichlet distribution is a generalization of the beta prime distribution.
- If $X\sim\beta'(\alpha,\beta)$, then $\ln X$ has a generalized logistic distribution. More generally, if $X\sim\beta'(\alpha,\beta,p,q)$, then $\ln X$ has a scaled and shifted generalized logistic distribution.
- If $X\sim\beta'\left(\frac{1}{2},\frac{1}{2}\right)$, then $\pm\sqrt{X}$ follows a Cauchy distribution, which is equivalent to a student-t distribution with the degrees of freedom of 1.
