= Burr distribution =

Probability distribution used to model household income

Burr Type XII
- Probability density function

- Cumulative distribution function
- Parameters: $c > 0\!$ $k > 0\!$
- Support: $x > 0\!$
- PDF: $ck\frac{x^{c-1}}{(1+x^c)^{k+1}}\!$
- CDF: $1-\left(1+x^c\right)^{-k}$
- Quantile: $\lambda \left (\frac{1}{(1-U)^{\frac{1}{k}}}-1 \right )^\frac{1}{c}$
- Mean: $\mu_1=k\operatorname{\Beta}(k-1/c,\, 1+1/c)$ where Β() is the beta function
- Median: $\left(2^{\frac{1}{k}}-1\right)^\frac{1}{c}$
- Mode: $\left(\frac{c-1}{kc+1}\right)^\frac{1}{c}$
- Variance: $-\mu_1^2+\mu_2$
- Skewness: $\frac{ 2\mu _{1}^{3}-3\mu _{1}\mu _{2}+\mu _{3}}{\left( -\mu _{1}^{2}+\mu _{2}\right)^{3/2}}$
- Excess kurtosis: $\frac{-3\mu _{1}^{4}+6\mu _{1}^{2}\mu _{2}-4\mu _{1}\mu _{3}+\mu _{4}}{\left( -\mu _{1}^{2}+\mu _{2}\right)^{2}}-3$ where moments (see) $\mu_r =k\operatorname{\Beta}\left(\frac{ck-r}{c},\, \frac{c+r}{c}\right)$
- CF: $$= \frac{c(-it)^{kc}}{\Gamma(k)}H_{1,2}^{2,1}\!\left[(-it)^c\left| \begin{matrix} (-k, 1)\\(0, 1),(-kc,c)\end{matrix}\right. \right], t\neq 0$$ $= 1, t = 0$ where $\Gamma$ is the Gamma function and $H$ is the Fox H-function.

In probability theory, statistics and econometrics, the Burr Type XII distribution or simply the Burr distribution is a continuous probability distribution for a non-negative random variable. It is also known as the Singh–Maddala distribution and is one of a number of different distributions sometimes called the "generalized log-logistic distribution".

== Definitions ==
=== Probability density function ===
The Burr (Type XII) distribution has probability density function:

$$\begin{align}
f(x;c,k) & = ck\frac{x^{c-1}}{(1+x^c)^{k+1}} \\[6pt]
f(x;c,k,\lambda) & = \frac{ck}{\lambda} \left( \frac{x}{\lambda} \right)^{c-1} \left[1 + \left(\frac{x}{\lambda}\right)^c\right]^{-k-1}
\end{align}$$

The $\lambda$ parameter scales the underlying variate and is a positive real.

=== Cumulative distribution function ===
The cumulative distribution function is:

$$F(x;c,k) = 1-\left(1+x^c\right)^{-k}$$
$$F(x;c,k,\lambda) = 1 - \left[1 + \left(\frac{x}{\lambda}\right)^c \right]^{-k}$$

== Applications ==
It is most commonly used to model household income, see for example: Household income in the U.S. and compare to magenta graph at right.

== Random variate generation ==
Given a random variable $U$ drawn from the uniform distribution in the interval $\left(0, 1\right)$, the random variable

$$X=\lambda \left (\frac{1}{\sqrt[k]{1-U}}-1 \right )^{1/c}$$

has a Burr Type XII distribution with parameters $c$, $k$ and $\lambda$. This follows from the inverse cumulative distribution function given above.

== Related distributions ==
- When c = 1, the Burr distribution becomes the Lomax distribution.
- When k = 1, the Burr distribution is a log-logistic distribution sometimes referred to as the Fisk distribution, a special case of the Champernowne distribution.
- The Burr Type XII distribution is a member of a system of continuous distributions introduced by Irving W. Burr (1942), which comprises 12 distributions.
- The Dagum distribution, also known as the inverse Burr distribution, is the distribution of 1 / X, where X has the Burr distribution
