= Log-logistic distribution =

Continuous probability distribution for a non-negative random variable

Log-logistic
- Probability density function $\alpha=1,$ values of $\beta$ as shown in legend

- Cumulative distribution function $\alpha=1,$ values of $\beta$ as shown in legend
- Parameters: $\alpha>0$ scale $\beta> 0$ shape
- Support: $x\in[0,\infty)$
- PDF: $\frac{ (\beta/\alpha)(x/\alpha)^{\beta-1} } { \left (1+(x/\alpha)^{\beta} \right)^2 }$
- CDF: ${ 1 \over 1+(x/\alpha)^{-\beta} }$
- Quantile: $\alpha\left( \frac{p}{1-p} \right)^{1/\beta}.$
- Mean: ${\alpha\,\pi/\beta \over \sin(\pi/\beta)}$ if $\beta>1$, else undefined
- Median: $\alpha\,$
- Mode: $\alpha\left(\frac{\beta-1}{\beta+1}\right)^{1/\beta}$ if $\beta> 1$, 0 otherwise
- Variance: See main text
- Entropy: $\ln \alpha\ - \ln \beta\ + 2$
- MGF: $\beta\alpha^{-\beta}\int_{0}^{\infty}\frac{e^{tx}x^{\beta-1}}{(1+(x/\alpha)^{\beta})^{2}}dx$$= \sum_{n=0}^{\infty}\frac{(\alpha t)^{n}}{n!}\Beta(1+\frac{n}{\beta},1-\frac{n}{\beta})$ where $\Beta$ is the Beta function.
- CF: $\beta\alpha^{-\beta}\int_{0}^{\infty}\frac{e^{itx}x^{\beta-1}}{(1+(x/\alpha)^{\beta})^{2}}dx$$= \sum_{n=0}^{\infty}\frac{(i\alpha t)^{n}}{n!}\Beta(1+\frac{n}{\beta},1-\frac{n}{\beta})$ where $\Beta$ is the Beta function.

In probability and statistics, the log-logistic distribution (known as the Fisk distribution in economics) is a continuous probability distribution for a non-negative random variable. It is used in survival analysis as a parametric model for events whose rate increases initially and decreases later, as, for example, mortality rate from cancer following diagnosis or treatment. It has also been used in hydrology to model stream flow and precipitation, in economics as a simple model of the distribution of wealth or income, and in networking to model the transmission times of data considering both the network and the software.

The log-logistic distribution is the probability distribution of a random variable whose logarithm has a logistic distribution.↵ It is similar in shape to the log-normal distribution but has heavier tails . Unlike the log-normal, its cumulative distribution function can be written in closed form.

== Characterization ==
There are several different parameterizations of the distribution in use. The one shown here gives reasonably interpretable parameters and a simple form for the cumulative distribution function [1]. The parameter $\alpha>0$ is a scale parameter and is also the median of the distribution. The parameter $\beta>0$ is a shape parameter. The distribution is unimodal when $\beta>1$ its dispersion decreases as it $\beta$ increases.

The cumulative distribution function is

$$\begin{align}
F(x; \alpha, \beta) & = {       1         \over 1+(x/\alpha)^{-\beta} } \\[5pt]
& = {(x/\alpha)^\beta \over 1+(x/\alpha)^   \beta  } \\[5pt]
& = {x^\beta \over \alpha^\beta+x^\beta}
\end{align}$$

where $x>0$, $\alpha>0$, $\beta>0.$

The probability density function is

$$f(x; \alpha, \beta) = \frac{ (\beta/\alpha)(x/\alpha)^{\beta-1} }
{  \left( 1+(x/\alpha)^{\beta} \right)^2  }$$

=== Alternative parameterization ===
An alternative parametrization is given by the pair $\mu, s$ in analogy with the logistic distribution:

$$\mu = \ln (\alpha)$$
$$s = 1 / \beta$$

== Properties ==
=== Moments ===
The $k$throw moment exists only when $k<\beta,$ when it is given by [3][4].

$$\begin{align}
\operatorname{E}(X^k)
&  = \alpha^k\operatorname{B}(1-k/\beta, 1+k/\beta) \\[5pt]
& = \alpha^k\, {k\pi/\beta \over \sin(k\pi/\beta)}
\end{align}$$

where B is the beta function. Expressions for the mean, variance, skewness, and kurtosis can be derived from this. Writing $b=\pi/\beta$ for convenience, the mean is

$$\operatorname{E}(X) = \alpha b / \sin b , \quad \beta>1,$$

and the variance is

$$\operatorname{Var}(X) = \alpha^2 \left( 2b / \sin 2b -b^2 / \sin^2 b \right), \quad \beta>2.$$

Explicit expressions for the skewness and kurtosis are lengthy. As $\beta$ tends to infinity, the mean tends to the variance and skewness tend to zero, and the excess kurtosis tends to 6/5 (see also related distributions below).

=== Quantiles ===
The quantile function (inverse cumulative distribution function) is

$$F^{-1}(p;\alpha, \beta) = \alpha\left( \frac{p}{1-p} \right)^{1/\beta}.$$

It follows that the median is, the lower quartile is, and the upper quartile is $3^{1/\beta} \alpha$.

== Applications ==
Hazard function. $\alpha=1,$ values of $\beta$ as shown in legend

=== Survival analysis ===
The log-logistic distribution provides one parametric model for survival analysis. Unlike the more commonly used Weibull distribution, it can have a non-monotonic hazard function: when $\beta>1,$ the hazard function is unimodal (when $\beta$ ≤ 1, the hazard decreases monotonically). The fact that the cumulative distribution function can be written in closed form is particularly useful for analysis of survival data with censoring. The log-logistic distribution can be used as the basis of an accelerated failure time model by allowing it $\alpha$ to differ between groups, or more generally by introducing covariates that affect it $\alpha$ but not $\beta$ by modelling $\log(\alpha)$ as a linear function of the covariates.

The survival function is

$$S(t) = 1 - F(t) = [1+(t/\alpha)^{\beta}]^{-1},\,$$

and so the hazard function is

$$h(t) = \frac{f(t)}{S(t)} = \frac{(\beta/\alpha)(t/\alpha)^{\beta-1}}
{1+(t/\alpha)^\beta}.$$

The log-logistic distribution with shape parameter $\beta = 1$ is the marginal distribution of the inter-times in a geometric-distributed counting process [8].

=== Hydrology ===
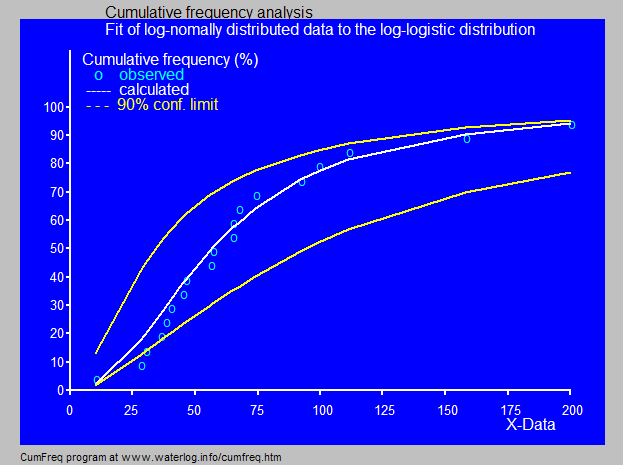
Fitted cumulative log-logistic distribution to maximum one-day October rainfalls

The log-logistic distribution has been used in hydrology for modeling stream flow rates and precipitation.

Extreme values like maximum one-day rainfall and river discharge per month or per year often follow a log-normal distribution [9]. The log-normal distribution, however, needs a numeric approximation. As the log-logistic distribution, which can be solved analytically, is similar to the log-normal distribution, it can be used instead.

The blue picture illustrates an example of fitting the log-logistic distribution to ranked maximum one-day October rainfalls, and it shows the 90% confidence belt based on the binomial distribution. The rainfall data are represented by the plotting position r/(n+1) as part of the cumulative frequency analysis .

=== Economics ===
The log-logistic has been used as a simple model of the distribution of wealth or income in economics, where it is known as the Fisk distribution. Its Gini coefficient is [11].

Derivation of Gini coefficient

The Gini coefficient for a continuous probability distribution takes the form:

$$G = {1\over{\mu}}\int_{0}^{\infty}F(1-F)dx$$

where $F$ is the CDF of the distribution and $\mu$ is the expected value. For the log-logistic distribution, the formula for the Gini coefficient becomes:

$$G = {\sin(\pi/\beta) \over{\alpha\pi/\beta}} \int_{0}^{\infty}{dx\over{[1+(x/\alpha)^{-\beta}][1+(x/\alpha)^{\beta}]}}$$

Defining the substitution $z = x/\alpha$ leads to the simpler equation:

$$G = {\sin(\pi/\beta) \over{\pi/\beta}} \int_{0}^{\infty}{dz\over{(1+z^{-\beta})(1+z^{\beta})}}$$

And making the substitution $u = 1/(1 + z^{\beta})$ further simplifies the Gini coefficient formula to:

$$G = {\sin(\pi/\beta)\over{\pi}} \int_{0}^{1}u^{-1/\beta}(1-u)^{1/\beta}du$$

The integral component is equivalent to the standard beta function $\text{B}(1-1/\beta,1+1/\beta)$. The beta function may also be written as:

$$\text{B}(x,y) = {\Gamma(x)\Gamma(y)\over{\Gamma(x+y)}}$$

where $\Gamma(\cdot)$ is the gamma function. Using the properties of the gamma function, it can be shown that:

$$\text{B}(1-1/\beta,1+1/\beta) = {1\over{\beta}}\Gamma(1-1/\beta)\Gamma(1/\beta)$$

From Euler's reflection formula, the expression can be simplified further:

$$\text{B}(1-1/\beta,1+1/\beta) = {1\over{\beta}} {\pi\over{\sin(\pi/\beta)}}$$

Finally, we may conclude that the Gini coefficient for the log-logistic distribution $G = 1/\beta$.

=== Networking ===
The log-logistic has been used as a model for the period of time beginning when some data leaves a software user application in a computer and the response is received by the same application after traveling through and being processed by other computers, applications, and network segments, most or all of them without hard real-time guarantees (for example, when an application is displaying data coming from a remote sensor connected to the Internet). It has been shown to be a more accurate probabilistic model for that than the log-normal distribution or others, as long as abrupt changes of regime in the sequences of those times are properly detected.

== Related distributions ==
- If $X \sim \operatorname{LL}(\alpha,\beta)$ then $kX \sim \operatorname{LL}(k \alpha, \beta).$
- If $X \sim \operatorname{LL}(\alpha, \beta)$ then $X^k \sim \operatorname{LL}(\alpha^k, \beta/|k|).$
- $\operatorname{LL}(\alpha,\beta) \sim \textrm{Dagum}(1,\alpha,\beta)$ (Dagum distribution).
- $\operatorname{LL}(\alpha,\beta) \sim \textrm{SinghMaddala}(1,\alpha,\beta)$ (Singh–Maddala distribution ).
- $\textrm{LL}(\gamma,\sigma) \sim \beta'(1,1,\gamma,\sigma)$ (Beta prime distribution).
- If X has a log-logistic distribution with scale parameter $\alpha$ and shape parameter, $\beta$ then Y = log(X) has a logistic distribution with location parameter $\log(\alpha)$ and scale parameter $1/\beta.$
- As the shape parameter $\beta$ of the log-logistic distribution increases, its shape increasingly resembles that of a (very narrow) logistic distribution. Informally:

$$\operatorname{LL}(\alpha, \beta) \to L(\alpha,\alpha/\beta) \quad \text{as} \quad \beta \to \infty.$$

- The log-logistic distribution with shape parameter $\beta=1$ and scale parameter $\alpha$ is the same as the generalized Pareto distribution with location parameter $\mu=0$, shape parameter $\xi=1$ and scale parameter $\alpha:$

$$\operatorname{LL}(\alpha,1) = \operatorname{GPD}(1,\alpha,1).$$

- The addition of another parameter (a shift parameter) formally results in a shifted log-logistic distribution, but this is usually considered in a different parameterization so that the distribution can be bounded above or bounded below.

=== Generalizations ===
Several different distributions are sometimes referred to as the generalized log-logistic distribution, as they contain the log-logistic as a special case. These include the Burr Type XII distribution (also known as the Singh–Maddala distribution) and the Dagum distribution, both of which include a second shape parameter. Both are in turn special cases of the even more general generalized beta distribution of the second kind. Another more straightforward generalization of the log-logistic is the shifted log-logistic distribution .

Another generalized log-logistic distribution is the log-transform of the metalog distribution, in which power series expansions in terms of $p$ are substituted for logistic distribution parameters $\mu$. The resulting log-metalog distribution is highly shape flexible, has a simple closed-form PDF and quantile function, can be fit to data with linear least squares, and subsumes the log-logistic distribution as a special case.

== See also ==
- Probability distributions: List of important distributions supported on semi-infinite intervals
