= Beta function =

Mathematical function

Contour plot of the beta function

In mathematics, the beta function, also called the Euler integral of the first kind, is a special function that is closely related to the gamma function and to binomial coefficients. It is defined by the integral

$$\Beta(z_1,z_2) = \int_0^1 t^{z_1-1}(1-t)^{z_2-1}\,dt$$

where $z_1, z_2$ are complex numbers such that $\min(\Re(z_1), \Re(z_2))>0$.

The beta function was studied by Leonhard Euler and Adrien-Marie Legendre and was given its name by Jacques Binet; its symbol $\Beta$ is a Greek capital beta.

== Properties ==
The beta function is symmetric, meaning that $\Beta(z_1,z_2) = \Beta(z_2,z_1)$ for all inputs $z_1$ and $z_2$.

A key property of the beta function is its close relationship to the gamma function:

$$\Beta(z_1,z_2)=\frac{\Gamma(z_1)\,\Gamma(z_2)}{\Gamma(z_1+z_2)}$$

=== Proof of the relation ===
Write the product of two factorials as integrals. Since they are integrals in two separate variables, we can combine them into an iterated integral:

$$\begin{align}
\Gamma(z_1)\Gamma(z_2) &= \int_{u=0}^\infty\ e^{-u} u^{z_1-1}\,du \cdot\int_{v=0}^\infty\ e^{-v} v^{z_2-1}\,dv \\[6pt]
&=\int_{v=0}^\infty\int_{u=0}^\infty\ e^{-u-v} u^{z_1-1}v^{z_2-1}\, du \,dv.
\end{align}$$

Changing variables by $u = st$ and $v=s(1-t)$, because $u + v = s$ and $u/(u+v)=t$, we have that the limits of integrations for $s$ are $0$ to $\infty$ and the limits of integration for $t$ are $0$ to $1$. Thus

$$\begin{align}
\Gamma(z_1)\Gamma(z_2) &= \int_{s=0}^\infty\int_{t=0}^1 e^{-s} (st)^{z_1-1}(s(1-t))^{z_2-1}s\,dt \,ds \\[6pt]
&= \int_{s=0}^\infty e^{-s}s^{z_1+z_2-1} \,ds\cdot\int_{t=0}^1 t^{z_1-1}(1-t)^{z_2-1}\,dt\\[1ex]
&=\Gamma(z_1+z_2) \cdot \Beta(z_1,z_2).
\end{align}$$

Dividing both sides by $\Gamma(z_1+z_2)$ gives the desired result. $\square$

The stated identity may be seen as a particular case of the identity for the integral of a convolution. Taking

$$\begin{align}f(u)&:=e^{-u} u^{z_1-1} \chi_{\R_+} \\ g(u)&:=e^{-u} u^{z_2-1} \chi_{\R_+}, \end{align}$$

one has:

$$\Gamma(z_1) \Gamma(z_2) = \int_{\R}f(u)\,du\cdot \int_{\R} g(u) \,du = \int_{\R}(f*g)(u)\,du =\Beta(z_1,z_2)\,\Gamma(z_1+z_2).$$

See The Gamma Function, page 18–19 for a derivation of this relation.

The beta function is also closely related to binomial coefficients. When $m$ (or $n$, by symmetry) is a positive integer, it follows from the definition of the gamma function $\Gamma$ that

$$\Beta(m,n) =\frac{(m-1)!\,(n-1)!}{(m+n-1)!} = \frac{m + n}{mn} \bigg/ \binom{m + n}{m}.$$

== Derivative ==
We have

$$\frac{\partial}{\partial z_1} \mathrm{B}(z_1, z_2) = \mathrm{B}(z_1, z_2) \left( \frac{\Gamma'(z_1)}{\Gamma(z_1)} - \frac{\Gamma'(z_1 + z_2)}{\Gamma(z_1 + z_2)} \right) = \mathrm{B}(z_1, z_2) \big(\psi(z_1) - \psi(z_1 + z_2)\big),$$

and more generally

$$\frac{\partial}{\partial z_m} \mathrm{B}(z_1, z_2, \dots, z_n) = \mathrm{B}(z_1, z_2, \dots, z_n) \left(\psi(z_m) - \psi{\left( \sum_{k=1}^n z_k \right)}\right), \quad 1\le m\le n,$$

where $\psi(z)$ denotes the digamma function.

== Approximation ==
Stirling's approximation gives the asymptotic formula

$$\Beta(x,y) \sim \sqrt {2\pi } \frac{x^{x - 1/2} y^{y - 1/2} }{(x + y)^{x + y - 1/2} }$$

for large $x$ and $y$.

If on the other hand $x$ is large and $y$ is fixed, then $\Beta(x,y) \sim \Gamma(y)\,x^{-y}.$

== Other identities and formulas ==
The integral defining the beta function may be rewritten in a variety of ways, including the following:

$$\begin{align}
\Beta(z_1,z_2) &= 2\int_0^{\pi / 2}(\sin\theta)^{2z_1-1}(\cos\theta)^{2z_2-1}\,d\theta, \\[6pt]
&= \int_0^\infty\frac{t^{z_1-1}}{(1+t)^{z_1+z_2}}\,dt, \\[6pt]
&= n\int_0^1t^{nz_1-1}(1-t^n)^{z_2-1}\,dt, \\
&= (1-a)^{z_2} \int_0^1 \frac{(1-t)^{z_1-1}t^{z_2-1}}{(1-at)^{z_1+z_2}}dt \qquad \text{for any } a\in\mathbb{R}_{\leq 1},
\end{align}$$

where in the second-to-last identity $n$} is any positive real number. One may move from the first integral to the second one by substituting $t = \tan^2(\theta)$.

For values $z=z_1=z_2\neq1$ we have:

$$\Beta(z,z) = \frac{1}{z}\int_0^{\pi / 2}\frac{1}{\left(\sqrt[z]{\sin\theta} + \sqrt[z]{\cos\theta}\right) ^{2z}}\,d\theta.$$

The beta function can be written as an infinite sum:

$$\Beta(x,y) = \sum_{n=0}^\infty \frac{(1-x)_n}{(y+n)\,n!}.$$

If $x$ and $y$ are equal we get

$$\Beta(z,z) = 2\sum_{n=0}^\infty \frac{(2z+n-1)_n (-1)^n}{(z+n)n!} = \lim_{x \to 1^-}2\sum_{n=0}^\infty \frac{(-2z)_n x^n}{(z+n)n!}$$

where $(x)_n$ is the rising factorial. The beta function can also be written as an infinite product

$$\Beta(x,y) = \frac{x+y}{x y} \prod_{n=1}^\infty \left( 1+ \dfrac{x y}{n (x+y+n)}\right)^{-1}.$$

The beta function satisfies several identities analogous to corresponding identities for binomial coefficients, including a version of Pascal's identity

$$\Beta(x,y) = \Beta(x, y+1) + \Beta(x+1, y),$$

which can be proved as follows:

$$\begin{aligned}
\Beta(x, y+1) + \Beta(x+1, y) &= \frac{\Gamma(x)\Gamma(y+1)}{\Gamma(x+y+1)} + \frac{\Gamma(x+1)\Gamma(y)}{\Gamma(x+y+1)}\\[5pt]
&= \frac{y\Gamma(x)\Gamma(y) + x\Gamma(x)\Gamma(y)}{(x+y)\Gamma(x+y)}\\[5pt]
&= \frac{\Gamma(x)\Gamma(y)}{\Gamma(x+y)} = \Beta(x,y).
\end{aligned}$$

The above proof also shows the simple recurrence on one coordinate

$$\Beta(x+1,y) = \Beta(x, y) \cdot \dfrac{x}{x+y}, \quad \Beta(x,y+1) = \Beta(x, y) \cdot \dfrac{y}{x+y}.$$

The positive integer values of the beta function are also the partial derivatives of the function

$$h(a, b) = \frac{e^a-e^b}{a-b}.$$

Indeed, for all nonnegative integers $m$ and $n$,

$$\Beta(m+1, n+1) = \frac{\partial^{m+n}h}{\partial a^m \, \partial b^n}(0, 0).$$

The Pascal-like identity above implies that this function is a solution to the first-order partial differential equation

$$h = h_a + h_b.$$

For $x, y \geq 1$, the beta function may be written in terms of a convolution involving the truncated power function $t \mapsto t_+^x$:

$$\Beta(x,y) \cdot\big(t \mapsto t_+^{x+y-1}\big) = \big(t\mapsto t_+^{x-1}\big) * \big(t \mapsto t_+^{y-1}\big)$$

Evaluation at particular points simplifies the expression significantly; for example,

$$\Beta(1,x) = \dfrac{1}{x}$$

and

$$\Beta(x,1-x) = \dfrac{\pi}{\sin(\pi x)}, \qquad x \not \in \mathbb{Z}$$

By taking $x = 1/2$ in this last formula, it follows that $\Gamma(1/2) = \sqrt{\pi}$. Generalizing this into a bivariate identity for a product of beta functions leads to:

$$\Beta(x,y) \cdot \Beta(x+y,1-y) = \frac{\pi}{x \sin(\pi y)} .$$

Also, by the Legendre duplication formula, we get

$$2^{z-1}\Beta(z/2,z/2) = \Beta(1/2,z/2).$$

Euler's integral for the beta function may be converted into an integral over the Pochhammer contour $C$ as

$$\left(1-e^{2\pi i\alpha}\right)\left(1-e^{2\pi i\beta}\right)\Beta(\alpha,\beta) =\int_C t^{\alpha-1}(1-t)^{\beta-1} \, dt.$$

This Pochhammer contour integral converges for all values of $\alpha$ and $\beta$ and so gives the analytic continuation of the beta function.

Just as the gamma function for integers describes factorials, the beta function can define a binomial coefficient after adjusting indices:

$$\binom{n}{k} = \frac{1}{(n+1)\,\Beta(n-k+1,\, k+1)}.$$

Moreover, for integer $n$, the beta function can be factored to give a closed form interpolation function for continuous values of $k$:

$$\binom{n}{k} = (-1)^n\, n! \cdot\frac{\sin (\pi k)}{\pi\prod_{i=0}^n (k-i)}.$$

== Reciprocal beta function ==
The reciprocal beta function is the function

$$f(x,y)=\frac{1}{\Beta(x,y)}$$

Interestingly, their integral representations closely relate as the definite integral of trigonometric functions with product of its power and multiple-angle:

$$\begin{align}
\int_0^\pi          \sin^{x-1}\theta\sin y\theta~d\theta &= \frac{\pi\sin\frac{y\pi}{2}}{2^{x-1} x \Beta{\left(\frac{x+y+1}{2},\frac{x-y+1}{2}\right)}}, \\[1ex]
\int_0^\pi          \sin^{x-1}\theta\cos y\theta~d\theta &= \frac{\pi\cos\frac{y\pi}{2}}{2^{x-1} x \Beta{\left(\frac{x+y+1}{2},\frac{x-y+1}{2}\right)}}, \\[1ex]
\int_0^\frac{\pi}{2}\cos^{x-1}\theta\cos y\theta~d\theta &= \frac{\pi}{                  2^x     x \Beta{\left(\frac{x+y+1}{2},\frac{x-y+1}{2}\right)}}.
\end{align}$$

== Incomplete beta function ==
The incomplete beta function, a generalization of the beta function, is defined as

$$\Beta(x;\,a,b) = \int_0^x t^{a-1}\,(1-t)^{b-1}\,dt.$$

For $x=1$, the incomplete beta function coincides with the complete beta function. For positive integers $a$ and $b$, the incomplete beta function is a polynomial of degree $a+b-1$ with rational coefficients.

Substituting $t = \sin^2\theta$ and $t = \frac1{1+s}$ gives alternative integral forms:

$$\Beta(x;\,a,b) = 2 \int_0^{\arcsin \sqrt x} \sin^{2a-1\!}\theta \cos^{2b-1\!}\theta \, d\theta = \int_{\frac{1-x}x}^\infty \frac{s^{b-1}}{(1+s)^{a+b}} \, ds.$$

It can also be written in terms of the hypergeometric function:

$$\Beta(x;\,a,b) = \frac{x^a}{a}\,{}_2F_1(a, 1-b; a+1; x)$$

The regularized incomplete beta function (or regularized beta function for short) is defined in terms of the incomplete beta function and the complete beta function:

$$I_x(a,b) = \frac{\Beta(x;\,a,b)}{\Beta(a,b)} = \frac{\Gamma(a+b)}{\Gamma(a)\Gamma(b)} \int_0^x t^{a-1}\,(1-t)^{b-1}\,dt.$$

The regularized incomplete beta function is the cumulative distribution function of the beta distribution, and is related to the cumulative distribution function $F(k;\,n,p)$ of a random variable $X$ following a binomial distribution with probability of single success $p$ and number of Bernoulli trials $n$:

$$F(k;\,n,p) = \Pr\left(X \leq k\right)
= I_{1-p}(n-k, k+1)
= 1 - I_p(k+1,n-k).$$

=== Properties ===
$$\begin{align}
I_0(a,b) &= 0, \\
I_1(a,b) &= 1, \\
I_x(a,1) &= x^a,\\
I_x(1,b) &= 1 - (1-x)^b, \\
I_x(a,b) &= 1 - I_{1-x}(b,a), \\
I_x(a+1,b) &= I_x(a,b)-\frac{x^a(1-x)^b}{a \Beta(a,b)}, \\
I_x(a,b+1) &= I_x(a,b)+\frac{x^a(1-x)^b}{b \Beta(a,b)}, \\
\frac{d}{dx} I_x(a,b) &= \frac{x^{a-1}(1-x)^{b-1}}{\Beta(a,b)},\\
\int I_x(a,b) \, dx &= x I_x(a,b) - \frac{a}{a+b}I_x(a+1,b) = \left(x-\frac{a}{a+b}\right)I_x(a,b) + \frac{x^a(1-x)^b}{(a+b)\Beta(a,b)}, \\ \\
\Beta(x;a,b) &= (-1)^a \Beta\left(\frac{x}{x-1};a,1-a-b\right), \\
\Beta(x;a,-a) &= \frac 1a \left(\frac x{1-x}\right)^a,\\
\frac{d}{dx} \Beta(x;a,b) &= x^{a-1}(1-x)^{b-1},\\
\int \Beta(x;a,b) \, dx &= x \Beta(x; a, b) - \Beta(x; a+1, b) = \left(x-\frac{a}{a+b}\right)\Beta(x;a,b) + \frac{x^a(1-x)^b}{a+b}.
\end{align}$$

=== Continued fraction expansion ===
The continued fraction expansion is

$$\Beta(x;\,a,b) = \frac{x^{a} (1 - x)^{b}}{a \left(1 + \frac{{d}_{1}}{1 + \frac{{d}_{2}}{1 + \frac{{d}_{3}}{1 + \cdots}}}\right)},$$

with odd and even coefficients given by

$$\begin{align}
{d}_{2m + 1} &= - \frac{(a + m) (a + b + m) x}{(a + 2 m) (a + 2 m + 1)}, \\[1ex]
{d}_{2m} &= \frac{m (b - m) x}{(a + 2 m - 1) (a + 2 m)}.
\end{align}$$

The $4 m$ and $4 m + 1$ convergents are less than $\Beta(x;\,a,b)$, while the $4 m + 2$ and $4 m + 3$ convergents are greater than $\Beta(x;\,a,b)$.

It converges rapidly for $x<(a+1)/(a+b+2)$. For $x > (a + 1)/(a + b + 2)$ or $1 - x < (b + 1)/(a + b + 2)$, the function may be evaluated more efficiently through the relation $\Beta(x;\,a,b) = \Beta(a, b) - \Beta(1 - x;\,b,a)$.

== Multivariate beta function ==
The beta function can be extended to a function with more than two arguments:

$$\Beta(\alpha_1,\alpha_2,\ldots\alpha_n) = \frac{\Gamma(\alpha_1)\,\Gamma(\alpha_2) \cdots \Gamma(\alpha_n)}{\Gamma(\alpha_1 + \alpha_2 + \cdots + \alpha_n)} .$$

This multivariate beta function is used in the definition of the Dirichlet distribution. Its relationship to the beta function is analogous to the relationship between multinomial coefficients and binomial coefficients. For example, it satisfies a similar version of Pascal's identity:

$$\Beta(\alpha_1,\alpha_2,\ldots\alpha_n) = \Beta(\alpha_1+1,\alpha_2,\ldots\alpha_n)+\Beta(\alpha_1,\alpha_2+1,\ldots\alpha_n)+\cdots+\Beta(\alpha_1,\alpha_2,\ldots\alpha_n+1) .$$

== Applications ==
The beta function is useful in computing and representing the scattering amplitude for Regge trajectories. Furthermore, it was the first known scattering amplitude in string theory, first conjectured by Gabriele Veneziano. It also occurs in the theory of the preferential attachment process, a type of stochastic urn process. The beta function is also important in statistics, e.g. for the beta distribution and beta prime distribution.

== Software implementation ==
Even if unavailable directly, the complete and incomplete beta function values can be calculated using functions commonly included in spreadsheet or computer algebra systems.

In Microsoft Excel, for example, the complete beta function can be computed with the GammaLn function (or special.gammaln in Python's SciPy package):

Value = Exp(GammaLn(a) + GammaLn(b) − GammaLn(a + b))

This result follows from the properties listed above.

The incomplete beta function cannot be directly computed using such relations and other methods must be used. In GNU Octave, it is computed using a continued fraction expansion.

The incomplete beta function has existing implementation in common languages. For instance, betainc (incomplete beta function) in MATLAB and GNU Octave, pbeta (probability of beta distribution) in R and betainc in SymPy. In SciPy, special.betainc computes the regularized incomplete beta function—which is, in fact, the cumulative beta distribution. To get the actual incomplete beta function, one can multiply the result of special.betainc by the result returned by the corresponding beta function. In Mathematica, Beta[x, a, b] and BetaRegularized[x, a, b] give $\Beta(x;\,a,b)$ and $I_x(a,b)$, respectively.

== See also ==
- Beta distribution and Beta prime distribution, two probability distributions related to the beta function
- Jacobi sum, the analogue of the beta function over finite fields.
- Nørlund–Rice integral
- Yule–Simon distribution
