= Multivariate Laplace distribution =

Probability distribution

In the mathematical theory of probability, multivariate Laplace distributions are extensions of the Laplace distribution and the asymmetric Laplace distribution to multiple variables. The marginal distributions of symmetric multivariate Laplace distribution variables are Laplace distributions. The marginal distributions of asymmetric multivariate Laplace distribution variables are asymmetric Laplace distributions.

== Symmetric multivariate Laplace distribution ==
Multivariate Laplace (symmetric)
- Parameters: μ ∈ R^{k} — location Σ ∈ R^{k×k} — covariance (positive-definite matrix)
- Support: x ∈ μ + span(Σ) ⊆ R^{k}
- PDF: If $\boldsymbol\mu = \mathbf{0}$, $\frac 2 {(2\pi)^{k/2} \left|\boldsymbol\Sigma\right|^{1/2}} \left( \frac {\mathbf{x}'\boldsymbol\Sigma^{-1} \mathbf{x}}{2} \right)^{v/2} K_v \left(\sqrt{2\mathbf{x}'\boldsymbol\Sigma^{-1} \mathbf{x}} \right),$ where $v = (2 - k) / 2$ and $K_v$ is the modified Bessel function of the second kind.
- Mean: μ
- Mode: μ
- Variance: Σ
- Skewness: 0
- CF: $\frac{\exp ( i\boldsymbol\mu'\mathbf{t} )}{1 + \tfrac{1}{2} \mathbf{t}'\boldsymbol\Sigma \mathbf{t} }$

A typical characterization of the symmetric multivariate Laplace distribution has the characteristic function:

$$\varphi(t;\boldsymbol\mu,\boldsymbol\Sigma) = \frac{\exp ( i\boldsymbol\mu'\mathbf{t} )}{1 + \tfrac{1}{2} \mathbf{t}'\boldsymbol\Sigma \mathbf{t}},$$

where $\boldsymbol\mu$ is the vector of means for each variable and $\boldsymbol\Sigma$ is the covariance matrix.

Unlike the multivariate normal distribution, even if the covariance matrix has zero covariance and correlation the variables are not independent. The symmetric multivariate Laplace distribution is elliptical.

=== Probability density function ===
If $\boldsymbol\mu = \mathbf{0}$, the probability density function (pdf) for a k-dimensional multivariate Laplace distribution becomes:

$$f_{\mathbf x}(x_1,\ldots,x_k) = \frac 2 {(2\pi)^{k/2} |\boldsymbol\Sigma|^{0.5}} \left( \frac {\mathbf{x}'\boldsymbol\Sigma^{-1} \mathbf{x}}{2} \right)^{v/2} K_v \left(\sqrt{2\mathbf{x}'\boldsymbol\Sigma^{-1} \mathbf{x}} \right),$$

where:

$v = (2 - k) / 2$ and $K_v$ is the modified Bessel function of the second kind.

In the correlated bivariate case, i.e., k = 2, with $\mu_1 = \mu_2 = 0$ the pdf reduces to:

$$f_{\mathbf x}(x_1,x_2) = \frac 1 {\pi \sigma_1 \sigma_2 \sqrt{1-\rho^2}} K_0 \left( \sqrt { \frac { 2 \left( \frac {x_1^2}{\sigma_1^2} - \frac{2 \rho x_1 x_2}{\sigma_1 \sigma_2}  +  \frac {x_2^2}{\sigma_2^2} \right)} { 1-\rho^2 } }  \right),$$

where:

$\sigma_1$ and $\sigma_2$ are the standard deviations of $x_1$ and $x_2$, respectively, and $\rho$ is the correlation coefficient of $x_1$ and $x_2$.

For the uncorrelated bivariate Laplace case, that is k = 2, $\mu_1 = \mu_2 = \rho = 0$ and $\sigma_1 = \sigma_2 = 1$, the pdf becomes:

$f_{\mathbf x}(x_1,x_2) = \frac 1 \pi K_0 \left( \sqrt { 2(x_1^2 + x_2^2) } \right).$

== Asymmetric multivariate Laplace distribution ==
Multivariate Laplace (asymmetric)
- Parameters: μ ∈ R^{k} — location Σ ∈ R^{k×k} — covariance (positive-definite matrix)
- Support: x ∈ μ + span(Σ) ⊆ R^{k}
- PDF: $\frac {2 e^{\mathbf{x}'\boldsymbol\Sigma^{-1} \boldsymbol\mu} }{(2\pi)^{\frac{k}{2}} |\boldsymbol\Sigma|^{0.5}} \Big( \frac {\mathbf{x}'\boldsymbol\Sigma^{-1} \mathbf{x}}{2 + \boldsymbol\mu'\boldsymbol\Sigma^{-1} \boldsymbol\mu} \Big)^\frac{v}{2} K_v \Big(\sqrt{(2 + \boldsymbol\mu'\boldsymbol\Sigma^{-1} \boldsymbol\mu)(\mathbf{x}'\boldsymbol\Sigma^{-1} \mathbf{x})} \Big)$ where $v = (2 - k) / 2$ and $K_v$ is the modified Bessel function of the second kind.
- Mean: μ
- Variance: Σ + μ ' μ
- Skewness: non-zero unless μ=0
- CF: $\frac{1}{1 + \tfrac{1}{2} \mathbf{t}'\boldsymbol\Sigma \mathbf{t} - i\boldsymbol\mu\mathbf{t} }$

A typical characterization of the asymmetric multivariate Laplace distribution has the characteristic function:

$\varphi(t;\boldsymbol\mu,\boldsymbol\Sigma) = \frac{1}{1 + \tfrac{1}{2} \mathbf{t}'\boldsymbol\Sigma \mathbf{t} - i\boldsymbol\mu\mathbf{t} }.$

As with the symmetric multivariate Laplace distribution, the asymmetric multivariate Laplace distribution has mean $\boldsymbol\mu$, but the covariance becomes $\boldsymbol\Sigma + \boldsymbol\mu'\boldsymbol\mu$. The asymmetric multivariate Laplace distribution is not elliptical unless $\boldsymbol\mu = \mathbf{0}$, in which case the distribution reduces to the symmetric multivariate Laplace distribution with $\boldsymbol\mu = \mathbf{0}$.

The probability density function (pdf) for a k-dimensional asymmetric multivariate Laplace distribution is:

$$f_{\mathbf x}(x_1,\ldots,x_k) = \frac {2 e^{\mathbf{x}'\boldsymbol\Sigma^{-1} \boldsymbol\mu} }{(2\pi)^{k/2} |\boldsymbol\Sigma|^{0.5}} \Big( \frac {\mathbf{x}'\boldsymbol\Sigma^{-1} \mathbf{x}}{2 + \boldsymbol\mu'\boldsymbol\Sigma^{-1} \boldsymbol\mu} \Big)^{v/2}  K_v \Big(\sqrt{(2 + \boldsymbol\mu'\boldsymbol\Sigma^{-1} \boldsymbol\mu)(\mathbf{x}'\boldsymbol\Sigma^{-1} \mathbf{x})} \Big),$$

where:

$v = (2 - k) / 2$ and $K_v$ is the modified Bessel function of the second kind.

The asymmetric Laplace distribution, including the special case of $\boldsymbol\mu = \mathbf{0}$, is an example of a geometric stable distribution. It represents the limiting distribution for a sum of independent, identically distributed random variables with finite variance and covariance where the number of elements to be summed is itself an independent random variable distributed according to a geometric distribution. Such geometric sums can arise in practical applications within biology, economics and insurance. The distribution may also be applicable in broader situations to model multivariate data with heavier tails than a normal distribution but finite moments.

The relationship between the exponential distribution and the Laplace distribution allows for a simple method for simulating bivariate asymmetric Laplace variables (including for the case of $\boldsymbol\mu = \mathbf{0}$). Simulate a bivariate normal random variable vector $\mathbf{Y}$ from a distribution with $\mu_1=\mu_2=0$ and covariance matrix $\boldsymbol\Sigma$. Independently simulate an exponential random variable $\mathbf{W}$ from an Exp(1) distribution. $\mathbf{X} = \sqrt{W} \mathbf{Y} + W \boldsymbol\mu$ will be distributed (asymmetric) bivariate Laplace with mean $\boldsymbol\mu$ and covariance matrix $\boldsymbol\Sigma$.
