= Log-Laplace distribution =

Probability distribution

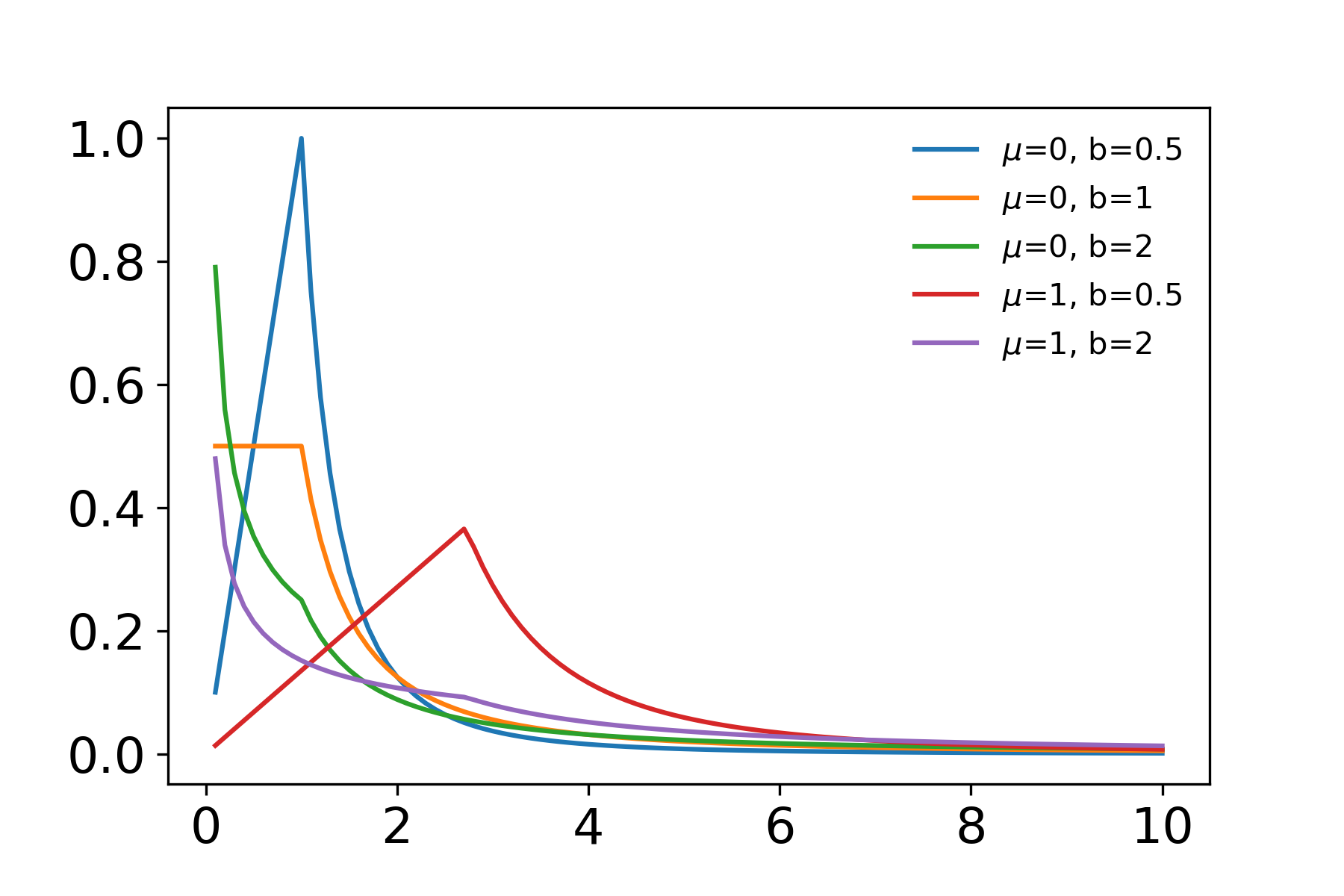
- Probability density function Probability density functions for Log-Laplace distributions with varying parameters $\mu$ and $b$.

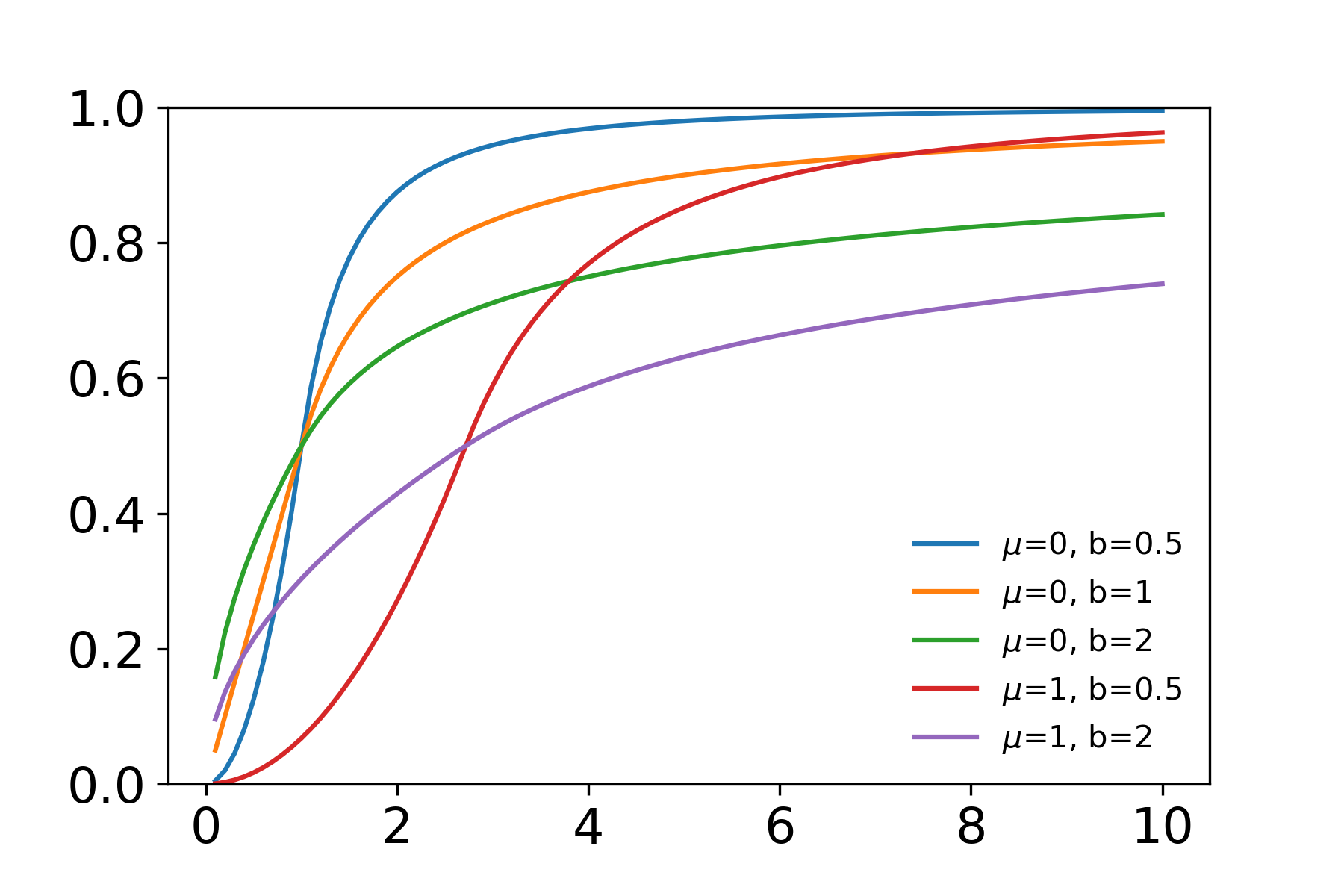
- Cumulative distribution function Cumulative distribution functions for Log-Laplace distributions with varying parameters $\mu$ and $b$.
- Parameters: $\mu>0$ (position), $b > 0\,$ (scale)
- Support: $x \in (0, +\infty)$
- PDF: $\frac{1}{2bx} \exp \left( -\frac{|\ln x-\mu|}{b} \right)$
- Mean: $\frac{e^{\mu}}{1-b^{2}}$
- Median: $e^{\mu}$
- Mode: $e^{\mu}$
- Variance: $\frac{e^{2\mu}b^{4}+2e^{2\mu}b^{2}}{1-4b^{6}+9b^{4}-6b^{2}}$
- Skewness: $\frac{4b^{5}+14b^{3}+30b}{2-9b^{4}-17b^{2}}\sqrt{\frac{1-4b^{2}}{b^{2}+2}}$
- Excess kurtosis: $\frac{832b^{2}-3786b^{4}-2217b^{6}-241b^{8}+12}{144b^{8}+551b^{6}+477b^{4}-96b^{2}+4}+b^{2}$
- Entropy: $\ln\left(2b\right)+\mu+1$

In probability theory and statistics, the log-Laplace distribution is the probability distribution of a random variable whose logarithm has a Laplace distribution. If X has a Laplace distribution with parameters μ and b, then Y = e^{X} has a log-Laplace distribution. The distributional properties can be derived from the Laplace distribution.

== Characterization ==
A random variable has a log-Laplace(μ, b) distribution if its probability density function is:

$$f(x|\mu,b) = \frac{1}{2bx} e^{-\frac{|\ln x-\mu|}{b}}$$

The cumulative distribution function for Y when y > 0, is

$$F(y) = 0.5 \left[ 1 + \operatorname{sgn}(\ln(y)-\mu) \left( 1 - e^{-\frac{|\ln(y)-\mu|}{b}} \right) \right]$$

== Generalization ==
Versions of the log-Laplace distribution based on an asymmetric Laplace distribution also exist. Depending on the parameters, including asymmetry, the log-Laplace may or may not have a finite mean and a finite variance.

== Properties ==
The mean or expected value of a log-Laplace distributed random variable X with a location parameter μ and a scale parameter b is given by

$$E(X)=\frac{e^{\mu}}{1-b^2}$$

The variance of X is given by

$$Var(X)=\frac{e^{2\mu}b^4+2e^{2\mu}b^2}{1-4b^6+9b^4-6b^2}$$
