= Geometric stable distribution =

Probability distribution

Geometric stable
- Parameters: $\alpha \in (0,2]$ — stability parameter $\beta \in [-1,1]$ — skewness parameter (note that skewness is undefined) $\lambda \in (0, \infty)$ — scale parameter $\mu \in (-\infty, \infty)$ — location parameter
- Support: $x \in \mathbb{R}$, or $x \in [\mu, \infty)$ if $\alpha < 1$ and $\beta = 1$, or $x\in (-\infty, \mu]$ if $\alpha < 1$ and $\beta = -1$
- PDF: not analytically expressible, except for some parameter values
- CDF: not analytically expressible, except for certain parameter values
- Median: $\mu$ when $\beta=0$
- Mode: $\mu$ when $\beta=0$
- Variance: $2\lambda^2$ when $\alpha = 2$, otherwise infinite
- Skewness: $0$ when $\alpha = 2$, otherwise undefined
- Excess kurtosis: $3$ when $\alpha = 2$, otherwise undefined
- MGF: undefined
- CF: $\ \left[1+\lambda^\alpha \vert t \vert^\alpha \omega - i \mu t\right]^{-1}$, where $$\omega  = \begin{cases} 1 - i\beta\tan\tfrac{\pi\alpha} 2\, \textrm{sign}(t) & \text{if }\alpha \ne 1 \\ 1 + i\tfrac{2}{\pi}\beta\log\vert t\vert \, \textrm{sign}(t) & \text{if } \alpha = 1 \end{cases}$$

A geometric stable distribution or geo-stable distribution is a type of leptokurtic probability distribution. These distributions are analogues for stable distributions for the case when the number of summands is random, independent of the distribution of summands, and having geometric distribution. The geometric stable distribution may be symmetric or asymmetric. A symmetric geometric stable distribution is also referred to as a Linnik distribution. The Laplace distribution and asymmetric Laplace distribution are special cases of the geometric stable distribution. The Mittag-Leffler distribution is also a special case of a geometric stable distribution.

The geometric stable distribution has applications in finance theory.

== Characteristics ==
For most geometric stable distributions, the probability density function and cumulative distribution function have no closed form. However, a geometric stable distribution can be defined by its characteristic function, which has the form:

$$\varphi(t;\alpha,\beta,\lambda,\mu) =
[1+\lambda^{\alpha}|t|^\alpha \omega  - i \mu t]^{-1}$$

where
$$\omega  = \begin{cases} 1 - i\beta\tan\left(\tfrac{\pi\alpha}{2}\right) \, \operatorname{sign}(t) & \text{if }\alpha \ne 1 \\
1 + i\tfrac{2}{\pi}\beta\log|t| \operatorname{sign}(t) & \text{if } \alpha = 1 \end{cases}$$.

The parameter $\alpha$, which must be greater than 0 and less than or equal to 2, is the shape parameter or index of stability, which determines how heavy the tails are. Lower $\alpha$ corresponds to heavier tails.

The parameter $\beta$, which must be greater than or equal to −1 and less than or equal to 1, is the skewness parameter. When $\beta$ is negative the distribution is skewed to the left and when $\beta$ is positive the distribution is skewed to the right. When $\beta$ is zero the distribution is symmetric, and the characteristic function reduces to:

$$\varphi(t;\alpha, 0, \lambda,\mu) =
[1+\lambda^{\alpha}|t|^\alpha - i \mu t]^{-1}$$.

The symmetric geometric stable distribution with $\mu=0$ is also referred to as a Linnik distribution. A completely skewed geometric stable distribution, that is, with $\beta=1$, $\alpha<1$, with $0<\mu<1$ is also referred to as a Mittag-Leffler distribution. Although $\beta$ determines the skewness of the distribution, it should not be confused with the typical skewness coefficient or 3rd standardized moment, which in most circumstances is undefined for a geometric stable distribution.

The parameter $\lambda>0$ is referred to as the scale parameter, and $\mu$ is the location parameter.

When $\alpha$ = 2, $\beta$ = 0 and $\mu$ = 0 (i.e., a symmetric geometric stable distribution or Linnik distribution with $\alpha$=2), the distribution becomes the symmetric Laplace distribution with mean of 0, which has a probability density function of:

$$f(x\mid 0,\lambda) = \frac{1}{2\lambda} \exp \left( -\frac{|x|} \lambda \right) \,\!$$.

The Laplace distribution has a variance equal to $2\lambda^2$. However, for $\alpha<2$ the variance of the geometric stable distribution is infinite.

== Relationship to stable distributions ==
A stable distribution has the property that if $X_1, X_2,\dots,X_n$ are independent, identically distributed random variables taken from such a distribution, the sum $Y = a_n (X_1 + X_2 + \cdots + X_n) + b_n$ has the same distribution as the $X_i$'s for some $a_n$ and $b_n$.

Geometric stable distributions have a similar property, but where the number of elements in the sum is a geometrically distributed random variable. If $X_1, X_2,\dots$ are independent and identically distributed random variables taken from a geometric stable distribution, the limit of the sum $Y = a_{N_p} (X_1 + X_2 + \cdots + X_{N_p}) + b_{N_p}$ approaches the distribution of the $X_i$'s for some coefficients $a_{N_p}$ and $b_{N_p}$ as p approaches 0, where $N_p$ is a random variable independent of the $X_i$'s taken from a geometric distribution with parameter p. In other words:

$$\Pr(N_p = n) = (1 - p)^{n-1}\,p\, .$$

The distribution is strictly geometric stable only if the sum $Y = a (X_1 + X_2 + \cdots + X_{N_p})$ equals the distribution of the $X_i$'s for some a.

There is also a relationship between the stable distribution characteristic function and the geometric stable distribution characteristic function. The stable distribution has a characteristic function of the form:

$$\Phi(t;\alpha,\beta,\lambda,\mu) =
\exp\left[~it\mu\!-\!|\lambda t|^\alpha\,(1\!-\!i \beta \operatorname{sign}(t) \Omega) ~\right] ,$$

where

$$\Omega = \begin{cases} \tan\tfrac{\pi\alpha}{2} & \text{if }\alpha \ne 1 ,\\
-\tfrac{2}{\pi}\log|t| & \text{if }\alpha = 1. \end{cases}$$

The geometric stable characteristic function can be expressed in terms of a stable characteristic function as:

$$\varphi(t;\alpha,\beta,\lambda,\mu) =
[1 - \log(\Phi(t;\alpha,\beta,\lambda,\mu))]^{-1} .$$

== See also ==
- Mittag-Leffler distribution
