= Location–scale family =

Family of probability distributions

In probability theory, especially in mathematical statistics, a location–scale family is a family of probability distributions parametrized by a location parameter and a non-negative scale parameter. For any random variable $X$ whose probability distribution function belongs to such a family, the distribution function of $Y \,\stackrel{d}{=}\, a + b X$ also belongs to the family (where $\stackrel{d}{=}$ means "equal in distribution"—that is, "has the same distribution as").

In other words, a class $\Omega$ of probability distributions is a location–scale family if for all cumulative distribution functions $F \in \Omega$ and any real numbers $a \in \mathbb{R}$ and $b > 0$, the distribution function $G(x) = F(a + b x)$ is also a member of $\Omega$.

- If $X$ has a cumulative distribution function $F_X(x)= P(X\le x)$, then $Y= a + b X$ has a cumulative distribution function $F_Y(y) = F_X\left(\frac{y-a}{b}\right)$.
- If $X$ is a discrete random variable with probability mass function $p_X(x)= P(X=x)$, then $Y= a + b X$ is a discrete random variable with probability mass function $p_Y(y) = p_X\left(\frac{y-a}{b}\right)$.
- If $X$ is a continuous random variable with probability density function $f_X(x)$, then $Y= a + b X$ is a continuous random variable with probability density function $f_Y(y) = \frac{1}{b}f_X\left(\frac{y-a}{b}\right)$.
- If $X$ has a moment generating function $M_X(t)$, then $Y= a + b X$ has a moment generating function $M_Y(t)=e^{at}M_X(bt)$.
- If $X$ has a characteristic function $\varphi_X(t)$, then $Y= a + b X$ has a characteristic function $\varphi_Y(t)=e^{iat}\varphi_X(bt)$.

Moreover, if $X$ and $Y$ are two random variables whose distribution functions are members of the family, and assuming existence of the first two moments and $X$ has zero mean and unit variance, then $Y$ can be written as $Y \,\stackrel{d}{=}\, \mu_Y + \sigma_Y X$ , where $\mu_Y$ and $\sigma_Y$ are the mean and standard deviation of $Y$.

In decision theory, if all alternative distributions available to a decision-maker are in the same location–scale family, and the first two moments are finite, then a two-moment decision model can apply, and decision-making can be framed in terms of the means and the variances of the distributions.

== Examples ==
Often, location–scale families are restricted to those where all members have the same functional form. Most location–scale families are univariate, though not all. Well-known families in which the functional form of the distribution is consistent throughout the family include the following:

- Normal distribution
- Elliptical distributions
- Cauchy distribution
- Uniform distribution (continuous)
- Uniform distribution (discrete)
- Logistic distribution
- Laplace distribution
- Student's t-distribution
- Generalized extreme value distribution

== Converting a single distribution to a location–scale family ==
The following shows how to implement a location–scale family in a statistical package or programming environment where only functions for the "standard" version of a distribution are available. It is designed for R but should generalize to any language and library.

The example here is of the Student's t-distribution, which is normally provided in R only in its standard form, with a single degrees of freedom parameter df. The versions below with _ls appended show how to generalize this to a generalized Student's t-distribution with an arbitrary location parameter m and scale parameter s.

Probability density function (PDF):	dt_ls(x, df, m, s) =	1/s * dt((x - m) / s, df)
Cumulative distribution function (CDF):	pt_ls(x, df, m, s) =	pt((x - m) / s, df)
Quantile function (inverse CDF):	qt_ls(prob, df, m, s) =	qt(prob, df) * s + m
Generate a random variate:	rt_ls(df, m, s) =	rt(df) * s + m

Note that these generalized functions do not have standard deviation s since standard t distributions do not have a standard deviation of 1.
