= Mittag-Leffler distribution =

Two kinds of probability distributions

The Mittag-Leffler distributions are two families of probability distributions on the half-line $[0,\infty)$. They are parametrized by a real $\alpha \in (0, 1]$ or $\alpha \in [0, 1]$. Both are defined with the Mittag-Leffler function, named after Gösta Mittag-Leffler.

== The Mittag-Leffler function ==
For any complex $\alpha$ whose real part is positive, the series

$$E_\alpha (z) := \sum_{n=0}^\infty \frac{z^n}{\Gamma(1+\alpha n)}$$

defines an entire function. For $\alpha = 0$, the series converges only on a disc of radius one, but it can be analytically extended to $\mathbb{C} \setminus \{1\}$.

== First family of Mittag-Leffler distributions ==
The first family of Mittag-Leffler distributions is defined by a relation between the Mittag-Leffler function and their cumulative distribution functions.

For all $\alpha \in (0, 1]$, the function $E_\alpha$ is increasing on the real line, converges to $0$ in $- \infty$, and $E_\alpha (0) = 1$. Hence, the function $x \mapsto 1-E_\alpha (-x^\alpha)$ is the cumulative distribution function of a probability measure on the non-negative real numbers. The distribution thus defined, and any of its multiples, is called a Mittag-Leffler distribution of order $\alpha$.

All these probability distributions are absolutely continuous. Since $E_1$ is the exponential function, the Mittag-Leffler distribution of order $1$ is an exponential distribution. However, for $\alpha \in (0, 1)$, the Mittag-Leffler distributions are heavy-tailed, with

$$E_\alpha (-x^\alpha) \sim \frac{x^{-\alpha}}{\Gamma(1-\alpha)}, \quad x \to \infty.$$

Their Laplace transform is given by:

$$\mathbb{E} (e^{- \lambda X_\alpha}) = \frac{1}{1+\lambda^\alpha},$$

which implies that, for $\alpha \in (0, 1)$, the expectation is infinite. In addition, these distributions are geometric stable distributions. Parameter estimation procedures can be found here.

== Second family of Mittag-Leffler distributions ==
The second family of Mittag-Leffler distributions is defined by a relation between the Mittag-Leffler function and their moment-generating functions.

For all $\alpha \in [0, 1]$, a random variable $X_\alpha$ is said to follow a Mittag-Leffler distribution of order $\alpha$ if, for some constant $C>0$,

$$\mathbb{E} (e^{z X_\alpha}) = E_\alpha (Cz),$$

where the convergence stands for all $z$ in the complex plane if $\alpha \in (0, 1]$, and all $z$ in a disc of radius $1/C$ if $\alpha = 0$.

A Mittag-Leffler distribution of order $0$ is an exponential distribution. A Mittag-Leffler distribution of order $1/2$ is the distribution of the absolute value of a normal distribution random variable. A Mittag-Leffler distribution of order $1$ is a degenerate distribution. In opposition to the first family of Mittag-Leffler distribution, these distributions are not heavy-tailed.

These distributions are commonly found in relation with the local time of Markov processes.
