= Asymmetric Laplace distribution =

Continuous probability distribution

Asymmetric Laplace
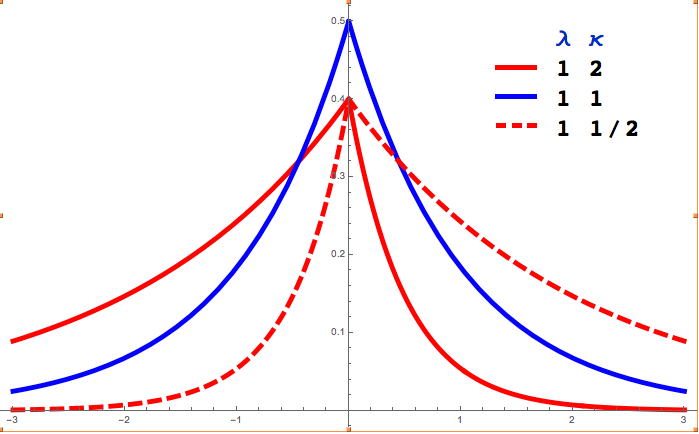
- Probability density function Asymmetric Laplace PDF with m = 0 in red. Note that the κ = 2 and 1/2 curves are mirror images. The κ = 1 curve in blue is the symmetric Laplace distribution.

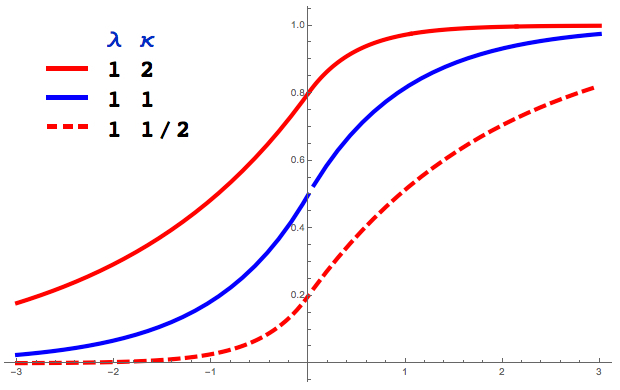
- Cumulative distribution function Asymmetric Laplace CDF with m = 0 in red.
- Parameters: $m$ location (real) $\lambda > 0$ scale (real) $\kappa > 0$ asymmetry (real)
- Support: $x \in (-\infty; +\infty)\,$
- PDF: (see article)
- CDF: (see article)
- Mean: $m+\frac{1-\kappa^2}{\lambda\kappa}$
- Median: $m+\frac{\kappa}{\lambda} \log\left(\frac{1+\kappa^2}{2\kappa^2}\right)$ if $\kappa > 1$ $m-\frac{1}{\lambda \kappa} \log\left(\frac{1 + \kappa^2}{2} \right)$ if $\kappa < 1$
- Variance: $\frac{1+\kappa^4}{\lambda^2\kappa^2}$
- Skewness: $\frac{2 \left(1-\kappa ^6\right)}{\left(\kappa ^4+1\right)^{3/2}}$
- Excess kurtosis: $\frac{6(1+\kappa^8)}{(1+\kappa^4)^2}$
- Entropy: $\log\left(e\,\frac{1+\kappa^2}{\kappa\lambda}\right)$
- CF: $\frac{ e^{i m t}}{(1+\frac{i t \kappa}{\lambda}) (1-\frac{i t}{\kappa\lambda})}$

In probability theory and statistics, the asymmetric Laplace distribution (ALD) is a continuous probability distribution which is a generalization of the Laplace distribution. Just as the Laplace distribution consists of two exponential distributions of equal scale back-to-back about x = m, the asymmetric Laplace consists of two exponential distributions of unequal scale back to back about x = m, adjusted to assure continuity and normalization. The difference of two variates exponentially distributed with different means and rate parameters will be distributed according to the ALD. When the two rate parameters are equal, the difference will be distributed according to the Laplace distribution.

== Characterization ==
=== Probability density function ===
A random variable has an asymmetric Laplace(m, λ, κ) distribution if its probability density function is

$$f(x;m,\lambda,\kappa)=\left(\frac{\lambda}{\kappa+1/\kappa}\right)\, e^{-(x-m)\lambda\, s \kappa^s}$$

where s=sgn(x-m), or alternatively:

$$f(x;m,\lambda,\kappa)  = \frac{\lambda}{\kappa+1/\kappa}
\begin{cases}
\exp \left( (\lambda/\kappa)(x-m) \right) & \text{if }x < m
\\[4pt]
\exp ( -\lambda\kappa(x-m) )  & \text{if }x \geq m
\end{cases}$$

Here, m is a location parameter, λ > 0 is a scale parameter, and κ is an asymmetry parameter. When κ = 1, (x-m)s κ^{s} simplifies to |x-m| and the distribution simplifies to the Laplace distribution.

=== Cumulative distribution function ===
The cumulative distribution function is given by:

$$F(x;m,\lambda,\kappa)  =
\begin{cases}
\frac{\kappa^2}{1+\kappa^2}\exp ((\lambda/\kappa)(x-m)) & \text{if }x \leq m
\\[4pt]
1-\frac{1}{1+\kappa^2} \exp (-\lambda\kappa(x-m))  & \text{if }x > m
\end{cases}$$

=== Characteristic function ===
The ALD characteristic function is given by:

$$\varphi(t;m,\lambda,\kappa)=\frac{ e^{i m t}}{(1+\frac{i t \kappa}{\lambda}) (1-\frac{i t}{\kappa\lambda})}$$

For m = 0, the ALD is a member of the family of geometric stable distributions with α = 2. It follows that if $\varphi_1$ and $\varphi_2$ are two distinct ALD characteristic functions with m = 0, then

$$\varphi=\frac{1}{1/\varphi_1+1/\varphi_2-1}$$

is also an ALD characteristic function with location parameter $m=0$. The new scale parameter λ obeys

$$\frac{1}{\lambda^2}=\frac{1}{\lambda_1^2}+\frac{1}{\lambda_2^2}$$

and the new skewness parameter κ obeys:

$$\frac{\kappa^2-1}{\kappa\lambda}=\frac{\kappa_1^2-1}{\kappa_1\lambda_1}+\frac{\kappa_2^2-1}{\kappa_2\lambda_2}$$

== Moments, mean, variance, skewness ==
The n-th moment of the ALD about m is given by

$$E[(x-m)^n]=\frac{n!}{\lambda^n(\kappa+1/\kappa)}\,(\kappa^{-(n+1)}-(-\kappa)^{n+1})$$

From the binomial theorem, the n-th moment about zero (for m not zero) is then:

$$E[x^n]=\frac{\lambda\,m^{n+1}}{\kappa+1/\kappa}\,\left(
\sum_{i=0}^n\frac{n!}{(n-i)!}\,\frac{1}{(m\lambda\kappa)^{i+1}}
-\sum_{i=0}^n\frac{n!}{(n-i)!}\,\frac{1}{(-m\lambda/\kappa)^{i+1}}
\right)$$

$$=
\frac{ \lambda \, m^{n+1}}{\kappa+1/\kappa}
\left(
e^{m \lambda\kappa} E_{-n}(m  \lambda\kappa )
-e^{-m \lambda/\kappa } E_{-n}(-m \lambda /\kappa)
\right)$$

where $E_n( )$ is the generalized exponential integral function $E_n(x)=x^{n-1}\Gamma(1-n,x)$

The first moment about zero is the mean:

$$\mu=E[x]=m-\frac{\kappa-1/\kappa}{\lambda}$$

The variance is:

$$\sigma^2=E[x^2]-\mu^2=\frac{1+\kappa^4}{\kappa^2\lambda^2}$$

and the skewness is:

$$\frac{E[x^3]-3\mu\sigma^2-\mu^3}{\sigma^3}=\frac{2 \left(1-\kappa ^6\right)}{\left(\kappa ^4+1\right)^{3/2}}$$

== Generating asymmetric Laplace variates ==
Asymmetric Laplace variates (X) may be generated from a random variate U drawn from the uniform distribution in the interval (-κ,1/κ) by:

$$X=m-\frac{1}{\lambda\,s\kappa^s}\log(1-U\,s\kappa^S)$$

where s=sgn(U).

They may also be generated as the difference of two exponential distributions. If X_{1} is drawn from exponential distribution with mean and rate (m_{1},λ/κ) and X_{2} is drawn from an exponential distribution with mean and rate (m_{2},λκ) then X_{1} - X_{2} is distributed according to the asymmetric Laplace distribution with parameters (m1-m2, λ, κ)

== Entropy ==
The differential entropy of the ALD is

$$H=-\int_{-\infty}^\infty f_{AL}(x)\log(f_{AL}(x)) dx = 1-\log\left(\frac{\lambda}{\kappa+1/\kappa}\right)$$

The ALD has the maximum entropy of all distributions with a fixed value (1/λ) of $(x-m)\,s\kappa^s$ where $s=\sgn(x-m)$.

== Alternative parametrization ==
An alternative parametrization is made possible by the characteristic function:

$\varphi(t;\mu,\sigma,\beta)=\frac{ e^{i \mu t}}{1-i \beta \sigma t +\sigma^2 t^2}$

where $\mu$ is a location parameter, $\sigma$ is a scale parameter, $\beta$ is an asymmetry parameter. This is specified in Section 2.6.1 and Section 3.1 of Lihn (2015). Its probability density function is

$$f(x;\mu,\sigma,\beta)  = \frac{1}{2 \sigma B_0}
\begin{cases}
\exp \left( \frac{x-\mu}{\sigma B^-} \right) & \text{if }x < \mu
\\[4pt]
\exp ( -\frac{x-\mu}{\sigma B^+} )  & \text{if }x \geq \mu
\end{cases}$$

where $B_0=\sqrt{1+\beta^2/4}$ and $B^\pm=B_0\pm\beta/2.$ It follows that $B^+ B^- = 1, B^+ - B^- = \beta.$

The n-th moment about $\mu$ is given by

$$E[(x-\mu)^n]=\frac{\sigma^n n!}{2 B_0} ( (B^+)^{n+1} + (-1)^n (B^-)^{n+1} )$$

The mean about zero is:

$E[x]=\mu+\sigma \beta$

The variance is:

$E[x^2]-E[x]^2=\sigma^2 (2+\beta^2)$

The skewness is:

$\frac{2\beta (3+\beta^2)}{(2+\beta^2)^{3/2}}$

The excess kurtosis is:

$\frac{6 (2+4\beta^2+\beta^4)}{(2+\beta^2)^{2}}$

For small $\beta$, the skewness is about $3\beta/\sqrt{2}$ . Thus $\beta$ represents skewness in an almost direct way.

== Alternative parameterization for Bayesian quantile regression ==
The Asymmetric Laplace distribution is commonly used with an alternative parameterization for performing quantile regression in a Bayesian inference context. Under this approach, the $\kappa$ parameter describing asymmetry is replaced with a $p$ parameter indicating the percentile or quantile desired. Using this parameterization, the likelihood of the Asymmetric Laplace Distribution is equivalent to the loss function employed in quantile regression. With this alternative parameterization, the probability density function is defined as:

$$f(x;m,\lambda,p)  = \frac{p(1-p)}{\lambda}
\begin{cases}
\exp \left( -((p-1)/\lambda)(x-m) \right) & \text{if }x \leq m
\\[4pt]
\exp ( -(p/\lambda)(x-m) )  & \text{if }x > m
\end{cases}$$

Where, m is a location parameter, λ > 0 is a scale parameter, and 0 < p < 1 is a percentile parameter.

The mean ($\mu$) and variance ($\sigma^2$) are calculated as:

$$\mu=m+\frac{1-2p}{p(1-p)}\lambda$$

$$\sigma^2=\frac{1-2p+2p^2}{p^2(1-p)^2}\lambda^2$$

The cumulative distribution function is given by:

$$F(x;m,\lambda,p)  =
\begin{cases}
p\exp (\frac{1-p}{\lambda}(x-m)) & \text{if }x \leq m
\\[4pt]
1-(1-p) \exp (\frac{-p}{\lambda}(x-m))  & \text{if }x > m
\end{cases}$$
