= Statistical parameter =

Quantity that indexes a parametrized family of probability distributions

In statistics, as opposed to its general use in mathematics, a parameter is any quantity of a statistical population that summarizes or describes an aspect of the population, such as a mean or a standard deviation. If a population exactly follows a known and defined distribution, for example the normal distribution, then a small set of parameters can be measured which provide a comprehensive description of the population and can be considered to define a probability distribution for the purposes of extracting samples from this population.

A "parameter" is to a population as a "statistic" is to a sample; that is to say, a parameter describes the true value calculated from the full population (such as the population mean), whereas a statistic is an estimated measurement of the parameter based on a sample (such as the sample mean, which is the mean of gathered data per sampling, called sample). Thus a "statistical parameter" can be more precisely referred to as a population parameter.

== Discussion ==
=== Parameterised distributions ===
Suppose that we have an indexed family of distributions. If the index is also a parameter of the members of the family, then the family is a parameterized family. Among parameterized families of distributions are the normal distributions, the Poisson distributions, the binomial distributions, and the exponential family of distributions. For example, the family of normal distributions has two parameters, the mean and the variance: if those are specified, the distribution is known exactly. The family of chi-squared distributions can be indexed by the number of degrees of freedom: the number of degrees of freedom is a parameter for the distributions, and so the family is thereby parameterized.

=== Measurement of parameters ===
In statistical inference, parameters are sometimes taken to be unobservable, and in this case the statistician's task is to estimate or infer what they can about the parameter based on a random sample of observations taken from the full population. Estimators of a set of parameters of a specific distribution are often measured for a population, under the assumption that the population is (at least approximately) distributed according to that specific probability distribution. In other situations, parameters may be fixed by the nature of the sampling procedure used or the kind of statistical procedure being carried out (for example, the number of degrees of freedom in a Pearson's chi-squared test). Even if a family of distributions is not specified, quantities such as the mean and variance can generally still be regarded as statistical parameters of the population, and statistical procedures can still attempt to make inferences about such population parameters.

=== Types of parameters ===
Parameters are given names appropriate to their roles, including the following:

- location parameter
- dispersion parameter or scale parameter
- shape parameter

Where a probability distribution has a domain over a set of objects that are themselves probability distributions, the term concentration parameter is used for quantities that index how variable the outcomes would be.

Quantities such as regression coefficients are statistical parameters in the above sense because they index the family of conditional probability distributions that describe how the dependent variables are related to the independent variables.

== Examples ==
During an election, there may be specific percentages of voters in a country who would vote for each particular candidate – these percentages would be statistical parameters. It is impractical to ask every voter before an election occurs what their candidate preferences are, so a sample of voters will be polled, and a statistic (also called an estimator) – that is, the percentage of the sample of polled voters – will be measured instead. The statistic, along with an estimation of its accuracy (known as its sampling error), is then used to make inferences about the true statistical parameters (the percentages of all voters).

Similarly, in some forms of testing of manufactured products, rather than destructively testing all products, only a sample of products are tested. Such tests gather statistics supporting an inference that the products meet specifications.
