= Moment (statistics) =

Measure of the shape of a probability distribution function

In statistics, the moments of a probability density function are measures related to the shape of the function's graph. The first moment is the expected value, the second central moment is the variance, the third standardized moment is the skewness, and the fourth standardized moment is the kurtosis.

In the mid-nineteenth century, Pafnuty Chebyshev became the first person to think systematically in terms of the moments of random variables.

== Formulation ==
The nth raw moment (i.e., moment about zero) of a random variable $X$ with density function $f(x)$ is defined by
$$\mu'_n = \langle X^{n} \rangle ~\overset{\mathrm{def}}{=}~ \begin{cases}
\sum_i x^n_i f(x_i), & \text{discrete distribution} \\[1.2ex]
\int x^n f(x) \, dx, & \text{continuous distribution}
\end{cases}$$

== Interpretation ==
The nth moment about zero of a probability density function $f(x)$ is the expected value of $X^n$ and is called a raw moment or crude moment or population moment or uncorrected moment. The moments about its mean $\mu$ are called central moments; these describe the shape of the function, independently of translation.

If $f$ is a probability density function, then the value of the integral above is called the nth moment of the probability distribution. More generally, if F is a cumulative probability distribution function of any probability distribution, which may not have a density function, then the nth moment of the probability distribution is given by the Riemann–Stieltjes integral
$$\mu'_n = \operatorname{E} \left[X^n\right] = \int_{-\infty}^\infty x^n\,\mathrm{d}F(x)$$
where X is a random variable that has this cumulative distribution F, and E is the expectation operator or mean. When
$$\operatorname{E}\left[ \left|X^n \right| \right] = \int_{-\infty}^\infty \left|x^n\right|\,\mathrm{d}F(x) = \infty$$
the moment is said not to exist. If the nth moment about any point exists, so does the (n − 1)th moment (and thus, all lower-order moments) about every point. The zeroth moment of any probability density function is 1, since the area under any probability density function must be equal to one.

Significance of moments (raw, central, standardised) and cumulants (raw, normalised), in connection with named properties of distributions
Moment ordinal	Moment			Cumulant	
Moment ordinal	Raw	Central	Standardized	Raw	Normalized
1	Mean	0	0	Mean	—N/a
2	—	Variance	1	Variance	1
3	—	—	Skewness	—	Skewness
4	—	—	(Non-excess or historical) kurtosis	—	Excess kurtosis
5	—	—	Hyperskewness	—	—
6	—	—	Hypertailedness	—	—
7+	—	—	—	—	—

=== Mean ===
The first raw moment is the mean, usually denoted $\mu \equiv \operatorname{E}[X].$

=== Variance ===
The second central moment is the variance. The positive square root of the variance is the standard deviation $\sigma \equiv \left(\operatorname{E}\left[(x - \mu)^2\right]\right)^\frac{1}{2}.$

=== Skewness ===
The third central moment is the measure of the lopsidedness of the distribution; any symmetric distribution will have a third central moment, if defined, of zero. The normalised third central moment is called the skewness, often γ. A distribution that is skewed to the left (the tail of the distribution is longer on the left) will have a negative skewness. A distribution that is skewed to the right (the tail of the distribution is longer on the right), will have a positive skewness.

For distributions that are not too different from the normal distribution, the median will be somewhere near μ − γσ/6; the mode about μ − γσ/2.

=== Kurtosis ===
The fourth central moment is a measure of the heaviness of the tail of the distribution. Since it is the expectation of a fourth power, the fourth central moment, where defined, is always nonnegative; and except for a point distribution, it is always strictly positive. The fourth central moment of a normal distribution is 3σ^{4}.

The kurtosis κ is defined to be the standardized fourth central moment. (Equivalently, as in the next section, excess kurtosis is the fourth cumulant divided by the square of the second cumulant.) If a distribution has heavy tails, the kurtosis will be high (sometimes called leptokurtic); conversely, light-tailed distributions (for example, bounded distributions such as the uniform) have low kurtosis (sometimes called platykurtic).

The kurtosis can be positive without limit, but κ must be greater than or equal to γ^{2} + 1; equality only holds for binary distributions. For unbounded skew distributions not too far from normal, κ tends to be somewhere in the area of γ^{2} and 2γ^{2}.

The inequality can be proven by considering
$$\operatorname{E}\left[\left(T^2 -  aT - 1\right)^2\right]$$
where T = (X − μ)/σ. This is the expectation of a square, so it is non-negative for all a; however it is also a quadratic polynomial in a. Its discriminant must be non-positive, which gives the required relationship.

== Other moments ==
=== Standardized moments ===
The normalised nth central moment or standardised moment is the nth central moment divided by σ^{n}; the normalised nth central moment of the random variable X is
$$\frac{\mu_n}{\sigma^n} = \frac{\operatorname{E}\left[(X - \mu)^n\right]}{\sigma^n} = \frac{\operatorname{E}\left[(X - \mu)^n\right]}{\operatorname{E}\left[(X - \mu)^2\right]^\frac{n}{2}} .$$

These normalised central moments are dimensionless quantities, which represent the distribution independently of any linear change of scale.

=== Higher moments ===
High-order moments are moments beyond 4th-order moments.

As with variance, skewness, and kurtosis, these are higher-order statistics, involving non-linear combinations of the data, and can be used for description or estimation of further shape parameters. The higher the moment, the harder it is to estimate, in the sense that larger samples are required in order to obtain estimates of similar quality. This is due to the excess degrees of freedom consumed by the higher orders. Further, they can be subtle to interpret, often being most easily understood in terms of lower order moments – compare the higher-order derivatives of jerk and jounce in physics. For example, just as the 4th-order moment (kurtosis) can be interpreted as "relative importance of tails as compared to shoulders in contribution to dispersion" (for a given amount of dispersion, higher kurtosis corresponds to thicker tails, while lower kurtosis corresponds to broader shoulders), the 5th-order moment can be interpreted as measuring "relative importance of tails as compared to center (mode and shoulders) in contribution to skewness" (for a given amount of skewness, higher 5th moment corresponds to higher skewness in the tail portions and little skewness of mode, while lower 5th moment corresponds to more skewness in shoulders).

=== Mixed moments ===
Mixed moments are moments involving multiple variables.

The value $E[X^k]$ is called the moment of order $k$ (moments are also defined for non-integral $k$). The moments of the joint distribution of random variables $X_1 ... X_n$ are defined similarly. For any integers $k_i\geq0$, the mathematical expectation $E[{X_1}^{k_1}\cdots{X_n}^{k_n}]$ is called a mixed moment of order $k$ (where $k=k_1+...+k_n$), and $E[(X_1-E[X_1])^{k_1}\cdots(X_n-E[X_n])^{k_n}]$ is called a central mixed moment of order $k$. The mixed moment $E[(X_1-E[X_1])(X_2-E[X_2])]$ is called the covariance and is one of the basic characteristics of dependency between random variables.

Some examples are covariance, coskewness and cokurtosis. While there is a unique covariance, there are multiple co-skewnesses and co-kurtoses.

== Related concepts ==
=== Cumulants ===
The first raw moment and the second and third unnormalized central moments are additive in the sense that if X and Y are independent random variables then
$$\begin{align}
m_1(X + Y) &= m_1(X) + m_1(Y) \\
\operatorname{Var}(X + Y) &= \operatorname{Var}(X) + \operatorname{Var}(Y) \\
\mu_3(X + Y) &= \mu_3(X) + \mu_3(Y)
\end{align}$$

(These can also hold for variables that satisfy weaker conditions than independence. The first always holds; if the second holds, the variables are called uncorrelated).

These are the first three quantities known as cumulants. Cumulants are somewhat similar to moments, but unlike moments, all cumulants have this additivity property, not just the first three.

=== Sample moments ===
For all k, the kth raw moment of a population can be estimated using the kth raw sample moment
$$\frac{1}{n}\sum_{i = 1}^{n} X^k_i$$
applied to a sample X_{1}, ..., X_{n} drawn from the population.

It can be shown that the expected value of the raw sample moment is equal to the kth raw moment of the population, if that moment exists, for any sample size n. It is thus an unbiased estimator. This contrasts with the situation for central moments, whose computation uses up a degree of freedom by using the sample mean. So for example an unbiased estimate of the population variance (the second central moment) is given by
$$\frac{1}{n - 1}\sum_{i = 1}^n \left(X_i - \bar{X}\right)^2$$
in which the previous denominator n has been replaced by the degrees of freedom n − 1, and in which $\bar X$ refers to the sample mean. This estimate of the population moment is greater than the unadjusted observed sample moment by a factor of $\tfrac{n}{n-1},$ and it is referred to as the "adjusted sample variance" or sometimes simply the "sample variance".

=== Problem of moments ===
Problems of determining a probability distribution from its sequence of moments are called problem of moments. Such problems were first discussed by P.L. Chebyshev (1874) in connection with research on limit theorems. In order that the probability distribution of a random variable $X$ be uniquely defined by its moments $\alpha_k = E\left[X^k\right]$ it is sufficient, for example, that Carleman's condition be satisfied:
$$\sum_{k=1}^\infin\frac{1}{\alpha_{2k}^{1/2k}} = \infin$$
A similar result even holds for moments of random vectors. The problem of moments seeks characterizations of sequences ${{\mu_n}': n = 1,2,3,\dots}$ that are sequences of moments of some function f, all moments $\alpha_k(n)$ of which are finite, and for each integer $k\geq1$ let
$$\alpha_k(n)\rightarrow \alpha_k ,n\rightarrow \infin,$$
where $\alpha_k$ is finite. Then there is a sequence ${\mu_n}'$ that weakly converges to a distribution function $\mu$ having $\alpha_k$ as its moments. If the moments determine $\mu$ uniquely, then the sequence ${\mu_n}'$ weakly converges to $\mu$.

== See also ==
- Generalised mean
- Method of moments (probability theory)
- Method of moments (statistics)
- Standardised moment
- Taylor expansions for the moments of functions of random variables
