= Birnbaum–Saunders distribution =

The Birnbaum–Saunders distribution, also known as the fatigue life distribution, is a probability distribution used extensively in reliability applications to model failure times. There are several alternative formulations of this distribution in the literature. It is named after Z. W. Birnbaum and S. C. Saunders.

== Theory ==
This distribution was developed to model failures due to cracks. A material is placed under repeated cycles of stress. The n^{th} cycle leads to an increase in the crack by $X_n$ amount. If we assume the increases $X_n$ are normal IID variables, their sum will be normally distributed with mean nμ and variance nσ^{2}. The probability that the crack does not exceed a critical length ω is

$$P\left( \sum_{j=1}^n X_j \le \omega \right) = \Phi\left( \frac{ \omega - n \mu }{ \sigma \sqrt{ n } } \right)$$

where $\Phi()$ is the cdf of normal distribution. If instead we think of T is the number of cycles to failure then the cumulative distribution function (cdf) of T is

$$P( T \le t ) = 1 - \Phi\left( \frac{ \omega - t \mu }{ \sigma \sqrt{ t } } \right)
= \Phi\left( \frac{ t \mu - \omega }{ \sigma \sqrt{ t } } \right)
= \Phi\left( \frac{ \mu \sqrt{ t } }{ \sigma } - \frac{ \omega }{ \sigma \sqrt{t} } \right)
= \Phi\left( \frac{ \sqrt{ \mu \omega } }{ \sigma } \left[ \left( \frac{ t }{ \omega / \mu } \right)^{ 1/2 }  - \left( \frac{ \omega / \mu }{ t } \right)^{ 1/2 } \right] \right)$$

Since the details of the underlying process are unknown, this is usually re-parameterized as

$$F( x; \alpha, \beta ) = \Phi\left( \frac{ 1 }{ \alpha } \left[ \left( \frac{ x }{ \beta } \right)^{1/2}  - \left( \frac{ \beta }{ x } \right)^{1/2} \right] \right)$$

where α is the shape parameter and β is the scale parameter. This family of distributions may still serve as a good approximation to the failure-time distribution even when the derivation's assumptions are not strictly adhered to.

== Properties ==
The Birnbaum–Saunders distribution is unimodal with a median of β.

The mean (μ), variance (σ^{2}), skewness (γ) and kurtosis (κ) are as follows:

$$\mu = \beta\left( 1 + \frac{ \alpha^2 }{ 2 } \right)$$

$$\sigma^2 = ( \alpha \beta )^2 \left( 1 + \frac{ 5 \alpha^2 }{ 4 } \right)$$

$$\gamma = \frac{ 4 \alpha ( 11 \alpha^2 + 6 ) }{ ( 5 \alpha^2 + 4 )^{\frac{3}{2}}}$$

$$\kappa = 3 + \frac{ 6 \alpha^2 ( 93 \alpha^2 + 40 ) }{ ( 5 \alpha^2 + 4 )^2 }$$

Given a data set that is thought to be Birnbaum–Saunders distributed the parameters' values are best estimated by maximum likelihood.

If T is Birnbaum–Saunders distributed with parameters α and β then T^{−1} is also Birnbaum-Saunders distributed with parameters α and β^{−1}.

=== Transformation ===
Let T be a Birnbaum-Saunders distributed variate with parameters α and β. A useful transformation of T is

$$X = \frac{ 1 }{ 2 } \left[ \left( \frac{ T }{ \beta } \right)^{ 0.5 } - \left( \frac{ T }{ \beta } \right)^{ -0.5 } \right]$$.

Equivalently

$$T = \beta\left( 1 + 2X^2 + 2X( 1 + X^2 )^{ 0.5 } \right)$$.

X is then distributed normally with a mean of zero and a variance of α^{2} / 4.

== Probability density function ==
The general formula for the probability density function (pdf) is

$$f(x) = \frac{\sqrt{\frac{x-\mu}{\beta}}+\sqrt{\frac{\beta}{x-\mu}}}{2\gamma\left(x-\mu\right)}\phi\left(\frac{\sqrt{\frac{x-\mu}{\beta}}-\sqrt{\frac{\beta}{x-\mu}}}{\gamma}\right)\quad x > \mu; \gamma,\beta>0$$

where γ is the shape parameter, μ is the location parameter, β is the scale parameter, and $\phi$ is the probability density function of the standard normal distribution.

== Standard fatigue life distribution ==
The case where μ = 0 and β = 1 is called the standard fatigue life distribution. The pdf for the standard fatigue life distribution reduces to

$$f(x) = \frac{\sqrt{x}+\sqrt{\frac{1}{x}}}{2\gamma x}\phi\left(\frac{\sqrt{x}-\sqrt{\frac{1}{x}}}{\gamma}\right)\quad x > 0; \gamma >0$$

Since the general form of probability functions can be expressed in terms of the standard distribution, all of the subsequent formulas are given for the standard form of the function.

== Cumulative distribution function ==
The formula for the cumulative distribution function is

$$F(x) = \Phi\left(\frac{\sqrt{x} - \sqrt{\frac{1}{x}}}{\gamma}\right)\quad x > 0; \gamma > 0$$

where Φ is the cumulative distribution function of the standard normal distribution.

== Quantile function ==
The formula for the quantile function is

$$G(p) = \frac{1}{4}\left[\gamma\Phi^{-1}(p) + \sqrt{4+\left(\gamma\Phi^{-1}(p)\right)^2}\right]^2$$

where Φ^{−1} is the quantile function of the standard normal distribution.

== Relationship to the Inverse Gaussian Distribution ==
The Birnbaum-Saunders distribution can be shown to be the result of an equal mixture between an inverse Gaussian and a reciprocal inverse Gaussian distribution.

This property can be conceptualized by considering the Wiener process with drift: the first hitting time to a point will have an inverse Gaussian distribution, the last hitting time to that point will have a reciprocal inverse Gaussian distribution, and the Birnbaum-Saunders distribution would represent the probability the process is beyond the point irrespective of how many times it has or will pass the point.
