= D'Agostino's K-squared test =

Goodness-of-fit measure in statistics

In statistics, D'Agostino's K^{2} test, named for Ralph D'Agostino, is a goodness-of-fit measure of departure from normality, that is the test aims to gauge the compatibility of given data with the null hypothesis that the data is a realization of independent, identically distributed Gaussian random variables. The test is based on transformations of the sample kurtosis and skewness, and has power only against the alternatives that the distribution is skewed and/or kurtic.

== Skewness and kurtosis ==
In the following, { x_{i} } denotes a sample of n observations, g_{1} and g_{2} are the sample skewness and kurtosis, m_{j}’s are the j-th sample central moments, and $\bar{x}$ is the sample mean. Frequently in the literature related to normality testing, the skewness and kurtosis are denoted as √β_{1} and β_{2} respectively. Such notation can be inconvenient since, for example, √β_{1} can be a negative quantity.

The sample skewness and kurtosis are defined as
$$\begin{align}
& g_1 = \frac{ m_3 }{ m_2^{3/2} } = \frac{\frac{1}{n} \sum_{i=1}^n \left( x_i - \bar{x} \right)^3}{\left( \frac{1}{n} \sum_{i=1}^n \left( x_i - \bar{x} \right)^2 \right)^{3/2}}\ , \\[1ex]
& g_2 = \frac{ m_4 }{ m_2^{2} }-3 = \frac{\frac{1}{n} \sum_{i=1}^n \left( x_i - \bar{x} \right)^4}{\left( \frac{1}{n} \sum_{i=1}^n \left( x_i - \bar{x} \right)^2 \right)^2} - 3\ .
\end{align}$$

These quantities consistently estimate the theoretical skewness and kurtosis of the distribution, respectively. Moreover, if the sample indeed comes from a normal population, then the exact finite sample distributions of the skewness and kurtosis can themselves be analysed in terms of their means μ_{1}, variances μ_{2}, skewnesses γ_{1}, and kurtosis γ_{2}. This has been done by Pearson (1931), who derived the following expressions:

$$\begin{align}
& \mu_1(g_1) = 0, \\
& \mu_2(g_1) = \frac{ 6(n-2) }{ (n+1)(n+3) }, \\
& \gamma_1(g_1) \equiv \frac{\mu_3(g_1)}{\mu_2(g_1)^{3/2}} = 0, \\
& \gamma_2(g_1) \equiv \frac{\mu_4(g_1)}{\mu_2(g_1)^{2}}-3 = \frac{ 36(n-7)(n^2+2n-5) }{ (n-2)(n+5)(n+7)(n+9) }.
\end{align}$$
and
$$\begin{align}
\mu_1(g_2) &= - \frac{6}{n+1}, \\[1ex]
\mu_2(g_2) &= \frac{ 24n(n-2)(n-3) }{ (n+1)^2(n+3)(n+5) }, \\[1ex]
\gamma_1(g_2) &\equiv \frac{\mu_3(g_2)}{\mu_2(g_2)^{3/2}} \\[0.5ex]
&= \frac{6(n^2-5n+2)}{(n+7)(n+9)} \sqrt{\frac{6(n+3)(n+5)}{n(n-2)(n-3)}}, \\[1ex]
\gamma_2(g_2) &\equiv \frac{\mu_4(g_2)}{\mu_2(g_2)^2}-3 \\[0.5ex]
&= \frac{ 36(15n^6-36n^5-628n^4+982n^3+5777n^2-6402n+900) }{ n(n-3)(n-2)(n+7)(n+9)(n+11)(n+13) }.
\end{align}$$
For example, a sample with size n = 1000 drawn from a normally distributed population can be expected to have a skewness of 0, SD 0.08 and a kurtosis of 0, SD 0.15, where SD indicates the standard deviation.

== Transformed sample skewness and kurtosis ==
The sample skewness g_{1} and kurtosis g_{2} are both asymptotically normal. However, the rate of their convergence to the distribution limit is frustratingly slow, especially for g_{2}. For example even with n = 5000 observations the sample kurtosis g_{2} has both the skewness and the kurtosis of approximately 0.3, which is not negligible. In order to remedy this situation, it has been suggested to transform the quantities g_{1} and g_{2} in a way that makes their distribution as close to standard normal as possible.

In particular, D'Agostino & Pearson (1973) suggested the following transformation for sample skewness:
$$Z_1(g_1) = \delta \operatorname{asinh}\left( \frac{g_1}{\alpha\sqrt{\mu_2}} \right),$$
where constants α and δ are computed as
$$\begin{align}
\alpha^2 &= \frac{2}{W^2 - 1}, &
\delta &= \frac{1}{\sqrt{\ln W}},
\end{align}$$
and

$$W^2 = \sqrt{2\gamma_2 + 4} - 1.$$

Also, μ_{2} = μ_{2}(g_{1}) is the variance of g_{1}, and γ_{2} = γ_{2}(g_{1}) is the kurtosis — the expressions given in the previous section.

Similarly, Anscombe & Glynn (1983) suggested a transformation for g_{2}, which works reasonably well for sample sizes of 20 or greater:
$$Z_2(g_2) = \sqrt{\frac{9A}{2}} \left[1 - \frac{2}{9A} - \left(\frac{ 1-2/A }{ 1+\frac{g_2-\mu_1}{\sqrt{\mu_2}}\sqrt{2/(A-4)} }\right)^{\!1/3}\right],$$
where
$$A = 6 + \frac{8}{\gamma_1} \left( \frac{2}{\gamma_1} + \sqrt{1+4/\gamma_1^2}\right),$$
and μ_{1} = μ_{1}(g_{2}), μ_{2} = μ_{2}(g_{2}), γ_{1} = γ_{1}(g_{2}) are the quantities computed by Pearson.

== Omnibus K^{2} statistic ==
Statistics Z_{1} and Z_{2} can be combined to produce an omnibus test, able to detect deviations from normality due to either skewness or kurtosis (D'Agostino, Belanger & D'Agostino 1990):
$$K^2 = Z_1(g_1)^2 + Z_2(g_2)^2\,$$

If the null hypothesis of normality is true, then K^{2} is approximately χ^{2}-distributed with 2 degrees of freedom.

Note that the statistics g_{1}, g_{2} are not independent, only uncorrelated. Therefore, their transforms Z_{1}, Z_{2} will be dependent also (Shenton & Bowman 1977), rendering the validity of χ^{2} approximation questionable. Simulations show that under the null hypothesis the K^{2} test statistic is characterized by

	expected value	standard deviation	95% quantile
n = 20	1.971	2.339	6.373
n = 50	2.017	2.308	6.339
n = 100	2.026	2.267	6.271
n = 250	2.012	2.174	6.129
n = 500	2.009	2.113	6.063
n = 1000	2.000	2.062	6.038
χ^{2}(2) distribution	2.000	2.000	5.991

== See also ==
- Shapiro–Wilk test
- Jarque–Bera test
