= Z. W. Birnbaum =

American mathematician

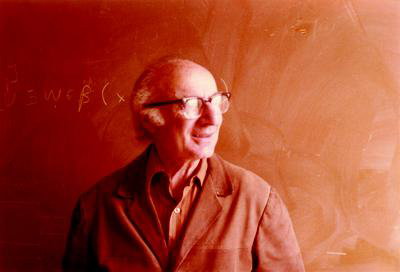
- Born: Zygmunt Wilhelm Birnbaum; October 18, 1903; Lemberg, Austria-Hungary
- Died: December 15, 2000 (aged 97); Seattle, Washington, United States
- Other name: Bill Birnbaum
- Citizenship: American
- Education: University of Lwów; University of Göttingen
- Known for: Birnbaum-Marshall inequality Birnbaum–Orlicz space Birnbaum–Saunders distribution nonparametric tests
- Awards: Guggenheim Fellowship; Wilks Memorial Award
- Scientific career
- Fields: Statistics, Mathematics
- Workplaces: University of Washington, Seattle
- Doctoral advisor: Hugo Steinhaus
- Other academic advisors: Edmund Landau; Felix Bernstein

Zygmunt Wilhelm "Z. W." Birnbaum (18 October 1903 – 15 December 2000), often known as Bill Birnbaum, was a Polish-American mathematician and statistician who contributed to functional analysis, nonparametric testing and estimation, probability inequalities, survival distributions, competing risks, and reliability theory.

== Education and career ==
After first earning a law degree and briefly practicing law, Birnbaum obtained his PhD in 1929 at the University of Lwów under the supervision of Hugo Steinhaus, and was associated with the Lwów School of Mathematics. He visited University of Göttingen, Germany from 1929 to 1931, first working as an assistant for Edmund Landau.

After studying insurance mathematics and earning a diploma in actuarial science with Felix Bernstein in Göttingen, he worked as an actuary in Vienna during 1931–1932, and was then transferred to Lwów where he continued working as an actuary. After obtaining a position as a correspondent for a Polish newspaper, he arrived in New York as a reporter in 1937. He became a professor of mathematics at the University of Washington in 1939 (with help from Harold Hotelling and letters of reference from Richard Courant, Albert Einstein, and Edmund Landau).

Birnbaum was actively involved in reliability work with Boeing through the Boeing Scientific Research Laboratories during the late 1950s and 1960s, and was a key member of the "Seattle school of reliability", a group which also included Tom Bray, Gordon Crawford, James Esary, George Marsaglia, Al Marshall, Frank Proschan, Ron Pyke, and Sam Saunders.

Birnbaum served as Editor of the Annals of Mathematical Statistics (1967–1970) and as President of the Institute of Mathematical Statistics (1964). He received a Guggenheim Fellowship in 1960 (spent at the Sorbonne, Paris), and a Fulbright Program Fellowship in 1964 (spent at the University of Rome).

== Selected publications ==
=== Books ===
- Introduction to Probability and Mathematical Statistics, 1962, Harper and Brothers.

=== Articles ===
- Birnbaum, Z.W.; Orlicz, W. (1931). "Über die Verallgemeinerung des Begriffes der zueinander konjugierten Potenzen" (PDF). Studia Mathematica. 3: 1–67. doi:10.4064/sm-3-1-1-67.
- Birnbaum, Z. W. (1948). "On random variables with comparable peakedness". Annals of Mathematical Statistics. 19 (1): 76–81. doi:10.1214/aoms/1177730293. JSTOR 2236059. MR 0024099.
- Birnbaum, Z. W.; Marshall, A.W. (1961). "Some multivariate Chebyshev inequalities with extensions to continuous parameter processes". Annals of Mathematical Statistics. 32 (3): 687–703. doi:10.1214/aoms/1177704964. JSTOR 2237830. MR 0148106.
- Birnbaum, Z. W.; Saunders, S. C. (1969). "A new family of life distributions". Journal of Applied Probability. 6 (2): 319–327. doi:10.2307/3212003. JSTOR 3212003. MR 0253493. S2CID 120549965.
- Birnbaum, Z. W.; Esary, J. D.; Marshall, A. W. (1966). "A stochastic characterization of wear-out for components and systems". Annals of Mathematical Statistics. 37 (4): 816–825. doi:10.1214/aoms/1177699362. JSTOR 2238571. MR 0193727.
- Birnbaum, Z. W.; Esary, J. D.; Saunders, S.C. (1961). "Multicomponent systems and structures and their reliability". Technometrics. 3 (1): 55–77. doi:10.1080/00401706.1961.10489927. JSTOR 1266477. MR 0122658. Archived from the original on September 26, 2017.
