= Luke Tierney =

American computer scientist

Luke Jon Tierney
- Citizenship: American
- Education: Johns Hopkins University (BA, MA); Cornell University (PhD)
- Known for: R Core Team; Markov chain Monte Carlo (MCMC); Metropolis–Hastings algorithm
- Awards: Fellow of the Institute of Mathematical Statistics (1988); Fellow of the American Statistical Association (1991); Guggenheim Fellowship (1992); ASA Statistical Computing and Graphics Award (2019); Fellow of the American Association for the Advancement of Science (2021)
- Scientific career
- Fields: Statistics, Computer Science
- Workplaces: University of Iowa; University of Minnesota; Carnegie Mellon University
- Doctoral advisor: Howard Milton Taylor III
- Doctoral students: Antonietta Mira
- Website: homepage.divms.uiowa.edu/~luke/

Luke Tierney is an American statistician and computer scientist. A fellow of the Institute of Mathematical Statistics since 1988 and of the American Statistical Association since 1991, Tierney is currently a professor of statistics at the University of Iowa. Through his past work on programming languages such as R and Lisp, Tierney now holds a position on the developing team known as the R Core.

== Education ==
Tierney earned his BA and MA in mathematical sciences from Johns Hopkins University in 1977 and later his PhD in operations research from Cornell University in 1980. Formerly a statistics faculty member at Carnegie Mellon University and the University of Minnesota, he now serves as the Ralph E. Wareham Professor of Mathematical Sciences at the University of Iowa, a position he has held since 2002.

== Work ==
In 1990, Tierney wrote the XLispStat package using C and Lisp and has since published works such as LISP-STAT: An Object-Oriented Environment for Statistical Computing and Dynamic Graphics (Wiley Series in Probability and Statistics) describing its design and use.

Tierney has also made contributions in areas such as reference counting, vectors, and compilation for the R programming language and environment. During his time working with R, he has also become part of the R Core, a team of developers with write access to the R source. His work on Markov chains, Bioconductor, Lisp-stat and the Metropolis–Hastings algorithm have all been highly cited.

== Positions, awards and recognition ==
- Current member of the R Core Team
- Former editor of the Journal of Computational and Graphical Statistics from 2004 to 2006
- American Statistical Association
  - Fellow since 1991
  - Recipient of the 2019 Statistical Computing and Graphics Award
- Institute of Mathematical Statistics
  - Fellow since 1988
  - Former elected council member from 1995 to 1998
- University of Iowa
  - Ralph E. Wareham Professor since 2002
  - Former chair of the statistics department from 2004 to 2014
