= XLispStat =

Statistical software package

- Developer(s): Luke Tierney
- Stable release: 3.52.23 / March 2, 2013; 12 years ago
- Written in: C, Lisp
- Operating system: UNIX/X11, Win16, Win32, MS-DOS, Classic MacOS, AmigaOS
- License: BSD-like open source license
- Website: homepage.divms.uiowa.edu/~luke/xls/xlsinfo/

XLispStat is a statistical scientific package based on the XLISP language.

Many free statistical software like ARC (nonlinear curve fitting problems) and ViSta are based on this package.

It includes a variety of statistical functions and methods, including routines for nonlinear curve fit. Many add-on packages have been developed to extend XLispStat, including contingency tables and regression analysis

XLispStat has seen usage in many fields, including astronomy, GIS, speech acoustics, econometrics, and epidemiology.

XLispStat was historically influential in the field of statistical visualization.

Its author, Luke Tierney, wrote a 1990 book on it.

XLispStat dates to the late 1980s/early 1990s and probably saw its greatest popularity in the early-to-mid 1990s with greatly declining usage since. In the 1990s it was in very widespread use in statistical education, but has since been mostly replaced by R. There is a paper explaining why UCLA's Department of Statistics abandoned it in 1998, and their reasons for doing so likely hold true for many other of its former users.

Source code to XLispStat is available under a permissive license (similar terms to BSD)

== See also ==
- R (programming language)
