= Standardized moment =

Normalized central moments

In probability theory and statistics, a standardized moment of a probability distribution is a moment (often a higher degree central moment) that is normalized, typically by a power of the standard deviation, rendering the moment scale invariant. The shape of different probability distributions can be compared using standardized moments.

== Standard normalization ==
Let X be a random variable with a probability distribution P and mean value $\mu = \operatorname{E}[X]$ (i.e. the first raw moment or moment about zero), the operator E denoting the expected value of X. Then the standardized moment of degree k is $\alpha_k = \mu_k/\sigma^k$, that is, the ratio of the k-th moment about the mean

$$\mu_k = \operatorname{E} \left[ ( X - \mu )^k \right]  = \int_{-\infty}^{\infty} {\left(x - \mu\right)}^k f(x)\,dx,$$

to the k-th power of the standard deviation,

$$\sigma^k = \mu_2^{k/2} = \operatorname{E}\!{\left[ {\left(X - \mu\right)}^2 \right]}^{k/2}.$$

The power of k is because moments scale as $x^k$, meaning that $\mu_k(\lambda X) = \lambda^k \mu_k(X):$ they are homogeneous functions of degree k, thus the standardized moment is scale invariant. This can also be understood as being because moments have dimension; in the above ratio defining standardized moments, the dimensions cancel, so they are dimensionless numbers.

The first four standardized moments can be written as:

Degree k		Comment
1	$\alpha_1 = \frac{\mu_1}{\sigma^1}= \frac{\operatorname{E} \left[ ( X - \mu )^1 \right]}{\left( \operatorname{E} \left[ ( X - \mu )^2 \right]\right)^{1/2}} = \frac{\mu - \mu}{\sqrt{ \operatorname{E} \left[ ( X - \mu )^2 \right]}} = 0$	The first standardized moment is zero, because the first moment about the mean is always zero.
2	$\alpha_2 = \frac{\mu_2}{\sigma^2} = \frac{\operatorname{E} \left[ ( X - \mu )^2 \right]}{\left( \operatorname{E} \left[ ( X - \mu )^2 \right]\right)^{2/2}} = 1$	The second standardized moment is one, because the second moment about the mean is equal to the variance σ^{2}.
3	$\alpha_3 = \frac{\mu_3}{\sigma^3} = \frac{\operatorname{E} \left[ ( X - \mu )^3 \right]}{\left( \operatorname{E} \left[ ( X - \mu )^2 \right]\right)^{3/2}}$	The third standardized moment is a measure of skewness.
4	$\alpha_4 = \frac{\mu_4}{\sigma^4} = \frac{\operatorname{E} \left[ ( X - \mu )^4 \right]}{\left( \operatorname{E} \left[ (X - \mu)^2 \right]\right)^{4/2}}$	The fourth standardized moment refers to the kurtosis.

For skewness and kurtosis, alternative definitions exist, which are based on the third and fourth cumulant respectively.

== Other normalizations ==
Another scale invariant, dimensionless measure for characteristics of a distribution is the coefficient of variation, $\sigma / \mu$. However, this is not a standardized moment, firstly because it is a reciprocal, and secondly because $\mu$ is the first moment about zero (the mean), not the first moment about the mean (which is zero).

See Normalization (statistics) for further normalizing ratios.

== See also ==
- Coefficient of variation
- Moment (mathematics)
- Central moment
- Standard score § Other normalizations
