= Shape parameter =

Kind of numerical parameter of a parametric family of probability distributions

In probability theory and statistics, a shape parameter (also known as form parameter) is a kind of numerical parameter of a parametric family of probability distributions that is neither a location parameter nor a scale parameter (nor a function of these, such as a rate parameter). Such a parameter must affect the shape of a distribution rather than simply shifting it (as a location parameter does) or stretching/shrinking it (as a scale parameter does). For example, 'peakedness' refers to how round the main peak is.

Probability density functions for selected distributions with mean 0 and variance 1.

== Estimation ==
Many estimators measure location or scale; however, estimators for shape parameters also exist. Most simply, they can be estimated in terms of the higher moments, using the method of moments, as in the skewness (3rd moment) or kurtosis (4th moment), if the higher moments are defined and finite. Estimators of shape often involve higher-order statistics (non-linear functions of the data), as in the higher moments, but linear estimators also exist, such as the L-moments. Maximum likelihood estimation can also be used.

== Examples ==
The following continuous probability distributions have a shape parameter:

- Beta distribution
- Burr distribution
- Dagum distribution
- Erlang distribution
- ExGaussian distribution
- Exponential power distribution
- Fréchet distribution
- Gamma distribution
- Generalized extreme value distribution
- Log-logistic distribution
- Log-t distribution
- Inverse-gamma distribution
- Inverse Gaussian distribution
- Pareto distribution
- Pearson distribution
- Skew normal distribution
- Lognormal distribution
- Student's t-distribution
- Tukey lambda distribution
- Weibull distribution

By contrast, the following continuous distributions do not have a shape parameter, so their shape is fixed and only their location or their scale or both can change. It follows that (where they exist) the skewness and kurtosis of these distribution are constants, as skewness and kurtosis are independent of location and scale parameters.

- Exponential distribution
- Cauchy distribution
- Logistic distribution
- Normal distribution
- Raised cosine distribution
- Uniform distribution
- Wigner semicircle distribution

== See also ==
- Skewness
- Kurtosis
- Location parameter
