= XLISP =

Programming language implementations

XLISP is a family of Lisp implementations written by David Betz and first released in 1983.

The first version was a Lisp with object-oriented extensions for computers with limited power. The second version (XLISP 2.0) moved toward Common Lisp, but was by no means a complete implementation. After a long period of inactivity, the author released a new version based on XSCHEME, his Scheme implementation. The most current version follows the Scheme R3RS standard.

== Derivatives ==
- AutoLISP, a programming and scripting language for AutoCAD, is based on a very old version of XLISP.
- XLISP-PLUS is a derivative of XLISP 2.0 that continues to add Common Lisp features. Winterp is a derivative of XLISP-PLUS.
- XLISP-STAT is an implementation of Lisp-Stat, an environment for dynamic graphics and statistics with objects.
- Nyquist is an extension of XLISP for sound synthesis.
- ANIMAL (AN IMage ALgebra) is an image manipulation environment created by Carla Maria Modena and Roberto Brunelli.
- A 1989 entry to the IOCCC identifies itself as "XLISP 4.0".
