= Antonietta Mira =

Italian statistician

Antonietta Mira is an Italian computational statistician whose research involves the application of Markov chain Monte Carlo methods to Bayesian inference. She is a professor of statistics in the Faculty of Economics and the Institute of Computational Science at the Università della Svizzera italiana in Lugano, Switzerland, and a professor of statistics at the University of Insubria in Italy.

== Education and career ==
Mira earned a degree in economics from the University of Pavia in 1991 and a doctorate in statistics from the University of Trento in 1995. She then went to the University of Minnesota for a second doctorate in statistics, which she completed in 1998. Her 1998 dissertation, Ordering, Slicing and Splitting Monte Carlo Markov Chains, was supervised by Luke Tierney.

She became a professor at the Università della Svizzera italiana in 2007 and added a second part-time affiliation as a professor at the University of Insubria in 2015. At the Università della Svizzera italiana, she was vice-dean from 2013 to 2015.

Mira has been active in the popularization of statistical thinking, directed a Swiss exhibit Number by numbers! in Bellinzona, and has been interviewed on Swiss media for her statistical expertise. She was appointed to the committee of the Swiss Statistical Society in 2020.

== Books ==
Mira is a co-author with Armando Massarenti of the 2020 Italian-language book La pandemia dei dati. Ecco il vaccino [The data pandemic: here's the vaccine]. She is also interested in mathematical stage magic and co-authored a book in Italian on the magic tricks of Luca Pacioli, Mate-Magica, I giochi di prestigio di Luca Pacioli (with Vanni Bossi and Francesco Arlati, 2012).

== Recognition ==
Mira's 1998 dissertation won the Leonard J. Savage Award of the International Society for Bayesian Analysis.

In 2016, Mira was elected as a Fellow of the International Society for Bayesian Analysis and as a Fellow of the Istituto Lombardo Accademia di Scienze e Lettere. She was named to the 2022 class of Fellows of the Institute of Mathematical Statistics, for "excellence in computational aspects of Bayesian statistics, for service to professional societies, and for innovative contributions in statistics communication and outreach".
