= Kurtosis =

Fourth standardized moment in statistics

Kurtosis (from Greek: κυρτός (kyrtos or kurtos), meaning 'curved, arching') refers to the degree of tailedness in the probability distribution of a real-valued, random variable in probability theory and statistics. Similar to skewness, kurtosis provides insight into specific characteristics of a distribution. Various methods exist for quantifying kurtosis in theoretical distributions, and corresponding techniques allow estimation based on sample data from a population. Different measures of kurtosis can yield varying interpretations.

The standard measure of a distribution's kurtosis, originating with Karl Pearson, is a scaled version of the fourth moment of the distribution. This number is related to the tails of the distribution, not its peak; hence, the sometimes-seen characterization of kurtosis as peakedness is incorrect. For this measure, higher kurtosis corresponds to greater extremity of deviations (or outliers), and not the configuration of data near the mean. The widespread misunderstanding of kurtosis may derive from Pearson's own description of kurtosis, as quoted by Westfall, as a departure from normality, a : 'degree of flat-toppedness which is greater or less than that of the normal curve'.

Excess kurtosis, typically compared to a value of 0, characterizes the tailedness of a distribution. A univariate normal distribution has an excess kurtosis of 0. Negative excess kurtosis indicates a platykurtic distribution, which does not necessarily have a flat top but produces fewer or less extreme outliers than the normal distribution. For instance, the uniform distribution (i.e., one that is uniformly finite over some bound and zero elsewhere) is platykurtic. On the other hand, positive excess kurtosis signifies a leptokurtic distribution. The Laplace distribution for example, has tails that decay more slowly than a normal one, resulting in more outliers. To simplify comparison with the normal distribution, excess kurtosis is calculated as Pearson's kurtosis minus 3. Some authors and software packages use kurtosis to refer specifically to excess kurtosis, but this article distinguishes between the two for clarity.

Alternative measures of kurtosis are: the L-kurtosis, which is a scaled version of the fourth L-moment; measures based on four population or sample quantiles. These are analogous to the alternative measures of skewness that are not based on ordinary moments.

== Pearson moments ==
The kurtosis is the fourth standardized moment, defined as
$$\begin{align}
\operatorname{Kurt}[X]
&:= \tilde{\mu}_4 \equiv \frac{\mu_4}{\sigma^4}\\
&=  \operatorname{E}\left[{\left(\frac{X - \mu}{\sigma}\right)}^4\right] = \frac{\operatorname{E}\left[(X - \mu)^4\right]}{\left(\operatorname{E}\left[(X - \mu)^2\right]\right)^2}\\
\end{align}$$

where μ_{4} is the fourth central moment and σ is the standard deviation. Several letters are used in the literature to denote the kurtosis. A very common choice is κ, which is fine as long as it is clear that it does not refer to a cumulant. Other choices include γ_{2}, to be similar to the notation for skewness, although sometimes this is instead reserved for the excess kurtosis. Pearson is systematically using β_{2}.

The kurtosis is bounded below by the squared skewness plus 1:
$$\frac{\mu_4}{\sigma^4} \geq \left(\frac{\mu_3}{\sigma^3}\right)^2 + 1,$$
where μ_{3} is the third central moment. The lower bound is realized by the Bernoulli distribution. There is no upper limit to the kurtosis of a general probability distribution, and it may be infinite.

A reason why some authors favor the excess kurtosis is that cumulants are extensive. Formulas related to the extensive property are more naturally expressed in terms of the excess kurtosis. For example, let X_{1}, ..., X_{n} be independent random variables for which the fourth moment exists, and let Y be the random variable defined by the sum of the X_{i}. The excess kurtosis of Y is
$$\operatorname{Kurt}[Y] - 3 = \frac{\sum_{i=1}^n \sigma_i^{\,4} \cdot \left(\operatorname{Kurt}\left[X_i\right] - 3\right)}{\left( \sum_{j=1}^n \sigma_j^{\,2}\right)^2},$$
where $\sigma_i$ is the standard deviation of X_{i}. In particular if all of the X_{i} have the same variance, then this simplifies to
$$\operatorname{Kurt}[Y] - 3 = \frac{1}{n^2} \sum_{i=1}^n \left(\operatorname{Kurt}\left[X_i\right] - 3\right).$$

The reason not to subtract 3 is that the bare moment better generalizes to multivariate distributions, especially when independence is not assumed. The cokurtosis between pairs of variables is an order four tensor. For a bivariate normal distribution, the cokurtosis tensor has off-diagonal terms that are neither 0 nor 3 in general, so attempting to "correct" for an excess becomes confusing. It is true, however, that the joint cumulants of degree greater than two for any multivariate normal distribution are zero.

For two random variables, X and Y, not necessarily independent, the kurtosis of the sum, X + Y, is
$$\begin{align}
\operatorname{Kurt}[X+Y] &= \frac{1}{\sigma_{X+Y}^4} \big(\sigma_X^4\operatorname{Kurt}[X] \\
& {} + 4\sigma_X^3 \sigma_Y   \operatorname{Cokurt}[X,X,X,Y] \\[6pt]
& {} + 6\sigma_X^2 \sigma_Y^2 \operatorname{Cokurt}[X,X,Y,Y] \\[6pt]
& {} + 4\sigma_X \sigma_Y^3   \operatorname{Cokurt}[X,Y,Y,Y] \\[6pt]
& {} + \sigma_Y^4 \operatorname{Kurt}[Y] \big).
\end{align}$$
Note that the fourth-power binomial coefficients (1, 4, 6, 4, 1) appear in the above equation.

=== Interpretation ===
The interpretation of the Pearson measure of kurtosis (or excess kurtosis) was once debated, but it is now well-established. As noted by Westfall in 2014, "... its unambiguous interpretation relates to tail extremity". Specifically, it reflects either the presence of existing outliers (for sample kurtosis) or the tendency to produce outliers (for the kurtosis of a probability distribution). The underlying logic is straightforward: kurtosis represents the average (or expected value) of standardized data raised to the fourth power. Standardized values less than 1—corresponding to data within one standard deviation of the mean (where the peak occurs)—contribute minimally to kurtosis. This is because raising a number less than 1 to the fourth power brings it closer to zero. The meaningful contributors to kurtosis are data values outside the peak region, i.e., the outliers. Therefore, kurtosis primarily measures outliers and provides no information about the central peak.

Numerous misconceptions about kurtosis relate to notions of peakedness. One such misconception is that kurtosis measures both the peakedness of a distribution and the heaviness of its tail. Other incorrect interpretations include notions like lack of shoulders (where the shoulder refers vaguely to the area between the peak and the tail, or more specifically, the region about one standard deviation from the mean) or bimodality. Balanda and MacGillivray argue that the standard definition of kurtosis "poorly captures the kurtosis, peakedness, or tail weight of a distribution." Instead, they propose a vague definition of kurtosis as the location- and scale-free movement of probability mass from the distribution's shoulders into its center and tails.

=== Moors' interpretation ===
In 1986, Moors gave an interpretation of kurtosis. Let
$$Z = \frac{ X - \mu } \sigma,$$
where X is a random variable, μ is the mean and σ is the standard deviation.

Now by definition of the kurtosis $\kappa$, and by the well-known identity $\operatorname{E}\left[V^2\right] = \operatorname{var}[V] + \operatorname{E}[V]^2,$
$$\begin{align}
\kappa & = \operatorname{E}\left[ Z^4 \right] \\
& = \operatorname{var}\left[ Z^2 \right] + \operatorname{E}{\!\left[Z^2\right]}^2 \\
& = \operatorname{var}\left[ Z^2 \right] + \operatorname{var}[Z]^2
= \operatorname{var}\left[ Z^2 \right] + 1.
\end{align}$$

The kurtosis can now be seen as a measure of the dispersion of Z^{2} around its expectation. Alternatively it can be seen to be a measure of the dispersion of Z around +1 and −1. κ attains its minimal value in a symmetric two-point distribution. In terms of the original variable X, the kurtosis is a measure of the dispersion of X around the two values μ ± σ.

High values of κ arise where the probability mass is concentrated around the mean and the data-generating process produces occasional values far from the mean, or where the probability mass is concentrated in the tails of the distribution.

=== Maximal entropy ===
The entropy of a distribution is $-\!\int p(x) \ln p(x) \, dx.$

For any $\mu \in \R^n, \Sigma \in \R^{n\times n}$ with $\Sigma$ positive definite, among all probability distributions on $\R^n$ with mean $\mu$ and covariance $\Sigma$, the normal distribution $\mathcal N(\mu, \Sigma)$ has the largest entropy.

Since mean $\mu$ and covariance $\Sigma$ are the first two moments, it is natural to consider extension to higher moments. In fact, by Lagrange multiplier method, for any prescribed first n moments, if there exists some probability distribution of form $p(x) \propto e^{\sum_i a_i x_i + \sum_{ij} b_{ij} x_i x_j + \cdots + \sum_{i_1 \cdots i_n} x_{i_1} \cdots x_{i_n}}$ that has the prescribed moments (if it is feasible), then it is the maximal entropy distribution under the given constraints.

By serial expansion,
$$\begin{align}
& \int \frac{1}{\sqrt{2\pi}} e^{-\frac 12 x^2 - \frac 14 gx^4} x^{2n} \, dx \\[6pt]
&= \frac{1}{\sqrt{2\pi}} \int e^{-\frac 12 x^2 - \frac 14 gx^4} x^{2n} \, dx \\[6pt]
&= \sum_k \frac{1}{k!} \left(-\frac{g}{4}\right)^k (2n+4k-1)!! \\[6pt]
&= (2n-1)!! - \tfrac{1}{4} g (2n+3)!! + O(g^2)
\end{align}$$
so if a random variable has probability distribution $p(x) = e^{-\frac 12 x^2 - \frac 14 gx^4}/Z$, where $Z$ is a normalization constant, then its kurtosis is $3 - 6g + O(g^2)$.

== Excess kurtosis ==
The excess kurtosis is defined as kurtosis minus 3. There are three distinct regimes as described below.

=== Mesokurtic ===
Distributions with zero excess kurtosis are called mesokurtic or mesokurtotic. The most prominent example of a mesokurtic distribution is the normal distribution family, regardless of the values of its parameters. A few other well-known distributions can be mesokurtic, depending on parameter values: for example, the binomial distribution is mesokurtic for $p = 1/2 \pm \sqrt{1/12}$.

=== Leptokurtic ===
A distribution with positive excess kurtosis is called leptokurtic, or leptokurtotic. A leptokurtic distribution has fatter tails. (lepto- means 'slender', originally referring to the peak.) Examples of leptokurtic distributions include the Student's t-distribution, Rayleigh distribution, Laplace distribution, exponential distribution, Poisson distribution and the logistic distribution. Such distributions are sometimes termed super-Gaussian.

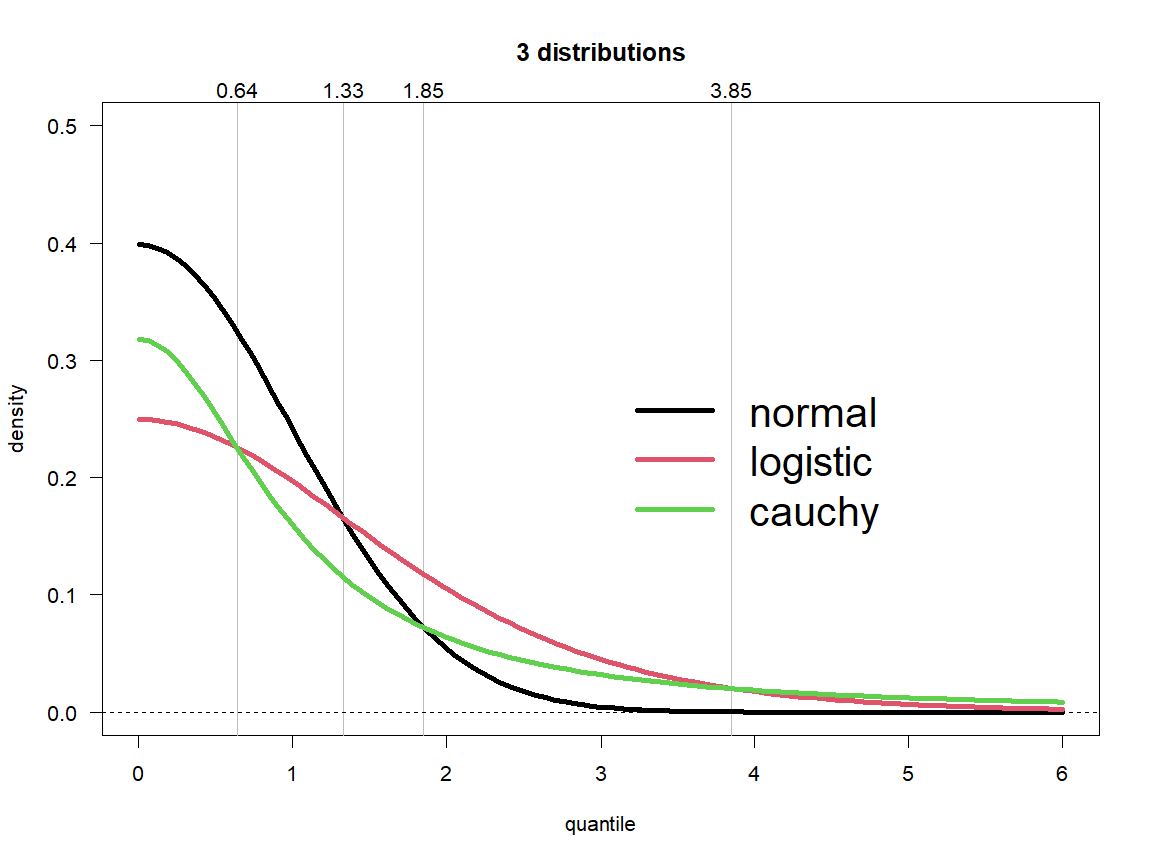
Three symmetric increasingly leptokurtic probability density functions; their intersections are indicated by vertical lines.

=== Platykurtic ===
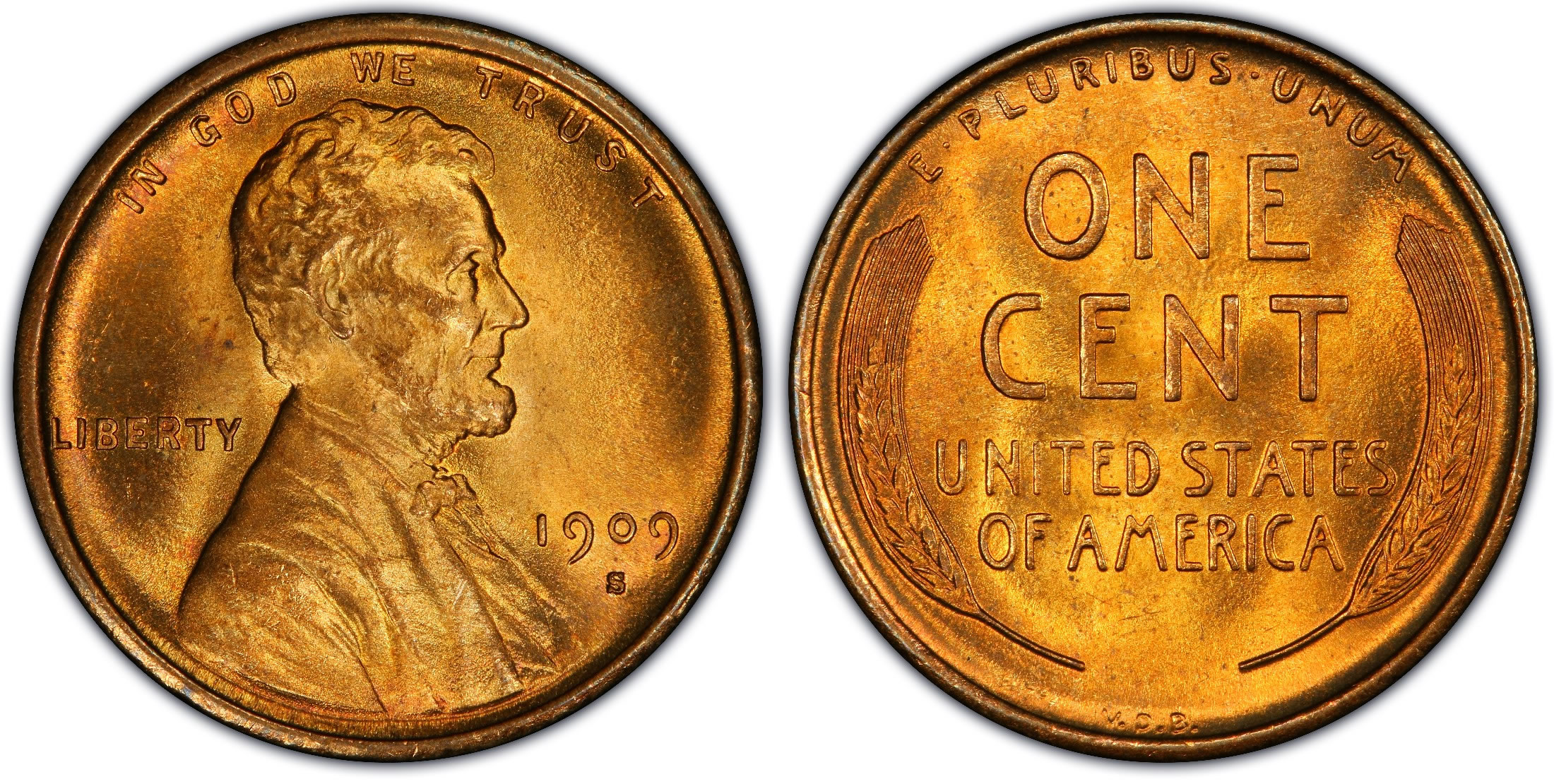
The coin toss is the most platykurtic distribution

A distribution with negative excess kurtosis is called platykurtic, or platykurtotic. A platykurtic distribution has thinner tails (platy- means 'broad', originally referring to the peak). Examples of platykurtic distributions include the continuous and discrete uniform distributions, and the raised cosine distribution. The most platykurtic distribution of all is the Bernoulli distribution with p = 1/2 (for example the number of times one obtains heads when flipping a coin once, a coin toss), for which the excess kurtosis is −2.

== Graphical examples ==
=== The Pearson type VII family ===
PDF for the Pearson type VII distribution with excess kurtosis of infinity (red); 2 (blue); and 0 (black)

Log-PDF for the Pearson type VII distribution with excess kurtosis of infinity (red); 2 (blue); 1, 1/2, 1/4, 1/8, and 1/16 (gray); and 0 (black)

The effects of kurtosis are illustrated using a parametric family of distributions whose kurtosis can be adjusted while their lower-order moments and cumulants remain constant. Consider the Pearson type VII family, which is a special case of the Pearson type IV family restricted to symmetric densities. The probability density function (PDF) is given by
$$f(x; a, m) = \frac{\Gamma(m)}{a\,\sqrt{\pi}\,\Gamma(m-1/2)} \left[1+\left(\frac{x}{a}\right)^2 \right]^{-m},$$
where a is a scale parameter and m is a shape parameter.

All densities in this family are symmetric. The k-th moment exists provided m > (k + 1)/2. For the kurtosis to exist, we require m > 5/2. Then the mean and skewness exist and are both identically zero. Setting a^{2} = 2m − 3 makes the variance equal to unity. Then the only free parameter is m, which controls the fourth moment (and cumulant) and hence the kurtosis. One can reparameterize with $m = 5/2 + 3/\gamma_2$, where $\gamma_2$ is the excess kurtosis as defined above. This yields a one-parameter leptokurtic family with zero mean, unit variance, zero skewness, and arbitrary non-negative excess kurtosis. The reparameterized density is
$$g(x; \gamma_2) = f{\left(x;\; a = \sqrt{2 + 6 \gamma_2^{-1}},\; m = \tfrac{5}{2} + 3\gamma_2^{-1} \right)}.$$

In the limit as $\gamma_2 \to \infty$, one obtains the density
$$g(x) = 3\left(2 + x^2\right)^{-5/2},$$
which is shown as the red curve in the images on the right.

In the other direction as $\gamma_2 \to 0$ one obtains the standard normal density as the limiting distribution, shown as the black curve.

In the images on the right, the blue curve represents the density $x \mapsto g(x; 2)$ with excess kurtosis of 2. The top image shows that leptokurtic densities in this family have a higher peak than the mesokurtic normal density, although this conclusion is only valid for this select family of distributions. The comparatively fatter tails of the leptokurtic densities are illustrated in the second image, which plots the natural logarithm of the Pearson type VII densities: the black curve is the logarithm of the standard normal density, which is a parabola. One can see that the normal density allocates little probability mass to the regions far from the mean (has thin tails), compared with the blue curve of the leptokurtic Pearson type VII density with excess kurtosis of 2. Between the blue curve and the black are other Pearson type VII densities with γ_{2} = 1, 1/2, 1/4, 1/8, and 1/16. The red curve again shows the upper limit of the Pearson type VII family, with $\gamma_2 = \infty$ (which, strictly speaking, means that the fourth moment does not exist). The red curve decreases the slowest as one moves outward from the origin (has fat tails).

=== Other well-known distributions ===
Probability density functions for selected distributions with mean 0, variance 1 and different excess kurtosis

Logarithms of probability density functions for selected distributions with mean 0, variance 1 and different excess kurtosis

Several well-known, unimodal, and symmetric distributions from different parametric families are compared here. Each has a mean and skewness of zero. The parameters have been chosen to result in a variance equal to 1 in each case. The images on the right show curves for the following seven densities, on a linear scale and logarithmic scale:

- D: Laplace distribution, also known as the double exponential distribution, red curve (two straight lines in the log-scale plot), excess kurtosis = 3
- S: hyperbolic secant distribution, orange curve, excess kurtosis = 2
- L: logistic distribution, green curve, excess kurtosis = 1.2
- N: normal distribution, black curve (inverted parabola in the log-scale plot), excess kurtosis = 0
- C: raised cosine distribution, cyan curve, excess kurtosis = −0.593762...
- W: Wigner semicircle distribution, blue curve, excess kurtosis = −1
- U: uniform distribution, magenta curve (shown for clarity as a rectangle in both images), excess kurtosis = −1.2.

Note that in these cases the platykurtic densities have bounded support, whereas the densities with positive or zero excess kurtosis are supported on the whole real line.

One cannot infer that high or low kurtosis distributions have the characteristics indicated by these examples. There exist platykurtic densities with infinite support, e.g., exponential power distributions with sufficiently large shape parameter b, and there exist leptokurtic densities with finite support. An example of the latter is a distribution that is uniform between −3 and −0.3, between −0.3 and 0.3, and between 0.3 and 3, with the same density in the (−3, −0.3) and (0.3, 3) intervals, but with 20 times more density in the (−0.3, 0.3) interval.

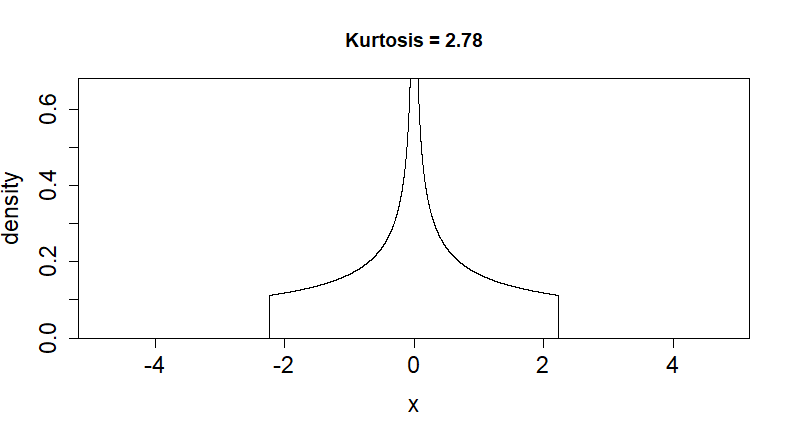
A platykurtic distribution that is infinitely peaked

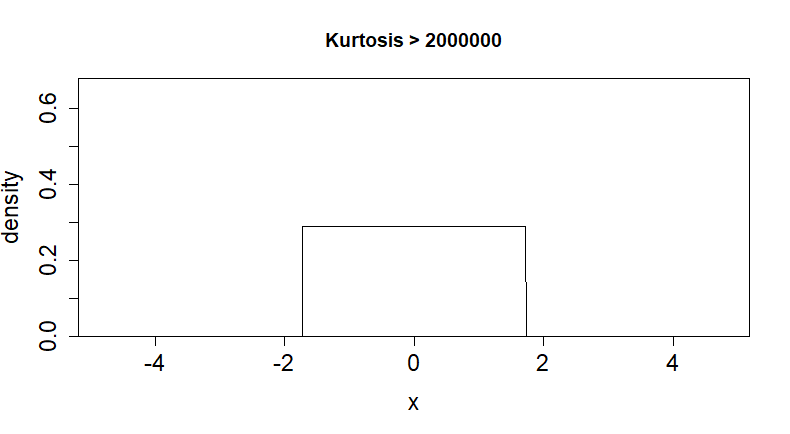
A leptokurtic distribution that is low and appears flat-topped

Also, one cannot infer from the graphs that higher kurtosis distributions are more peaked and that lower kurtosis distributions are more flat. There exist platykurtic densities with infinite peakedness; e.g., an equal mixture of the beta distribution with parameters 0.5 and 1 with its reflection about 0.0, and there exist leptokurtic densities that appear flat-topped; e.g., a mixture of distribution that is uniform between −1 and 1 with a T(4.0000001) Student's t-distribution, with mixing probabilities 0.999 and 0.001.

Graphs of the standardized versions of these distributions are given to the right.

== Sample kurtosis ==
=== Definitions ===
==== A natural but biased estimator ====
For a sample of n values, a method of moments estimator of the population excess kurtosis can be defined as
$$g_2 \equiv \frac{m_4}{m_2^2} -3
= \frac{\tfrac{1}{n} \sum_{i=1}^n \left(x_i - \overline{x}\right)^4}{\left[\tfrac{1}{n} \sum_{i=1}^n \left(x_i - \overline{x}\right)^2\right]^2} - 3$$
where m_{4} is the fourth sample moment about the mean, m_{2} is the second sample moment about the mean (that is, the sample variance), x_{i} is the i-th value, and $\overline{x}$ is the sample mean.

This formula has the simpler representation,
$$g_2 = \frac{1}{n} \sum_{i=1}^n z_i^4 - 3$$
where the $z_i$ values are the standardized data values using the standard deviation defined using n rather than n − 1 in the denominator.

For example, suppose the data values are 0, 3, 4, 1, 2, 3, 0, 2, 1, 3, 2, 0, 2, 2, 3, 2, 5, 2, 3, 999.

Then the z_{i} values are −0.239, −0.225, −0.221, −0.234, −0.230, −0.225, −0.239, −0.230, −0.234, −0.225, −0.230, −0.239, −0.230, −0.230, −0.225, −0.230, −0.216, −0.230, −0.225, 4.359

and the z_{i}^{4} values are 0.003, 0.003, 0.002, 0.003, 0.003, 0.003, 0.003, 0.003, 0.003, 0.003, 0.003, 0.003, 0.003, 0.003, 0.003, 0.003, 0.002, 0.003, 0.003, 360.976.

The average of these values is 18.05 and the excess kurtosis is thus 18.05 − 3 = 15.05. This example makes it clear that data near the middle or peak of the distribution do not contribute to the kurtosis statistic, hence kurtosis does not measure peakedness. It is simply a measure of the outlier, 999 in this example.

==== Standard unbiased estimator ====
Given a sub-set of samples from a population, the sample excess kurtosis $g_2$ above is a biased estimator of the population excess kurtosis. An alternative estimator of the population excess kurtosis, which is unbiased in random samples of a normal distribution, is defined as follows:
$$\begin{align}
&G_2 \equiv \frac{k_4}{k_2^2}\\
&= \frac{n^2\,\left[(n+1)\,m_4 - 3\,(n-1)\,m_2^2\right]}{(n-1)\,(n-2)\,(n-3)} \; \frac{(n-1)^2}{n^2\,m_2^2} \\[6pt]
& = \frac{n-1}{(n-2)\,(n-3)} \left[(n+1)\,\frac{m_4}{m_2^2} - 3\,(n-1) \right] \\[6pt]
& = \frac{n-1}{(n-2)\,(n-3)} \left[(n+1)\,g_2 + 6 \right]
\end{align}$$
where k_{4} is the unique symmetric unbiased estimator of the fourth cumulant, k_{2} is the unbiased estimate of the second cumulant (identical to the unbiased estimate of the sample variance), m_{4} is the fourth sample moment about the mean, m_{2} is the second sample moment about the mean, x_{i} is the i-th value, and $\bar{x}$ is the sample mean. This adjusted Fisher–Pearson standardized moment coefficient $G_2$ is the version found in Excel and several statistical packages including Minitab, SAS, and SPSS.

Unfortunately, in non-normal samples $G_2$ is itself generally biased.

=== Upper bound ===
An upper bound for the sample kurtosis of n (n > 2) real numbers is
$$g_2 \le \frac{1}{2} \frac{n-3}{n-2} g_1^2 + \frac{n}{2} - 3,$$
where $g_1 = m_3/m_2^{3/2}$ is the corresponding sample skewness.

=== Variance under normality ===
The variance of the sample kurtosis of a sample of size n from the normal distribution is
$$\operatorname{var}(g_2) = \frac{24n(n-1)^2}{(n-3)(n-2)(n+3)(n+5)}$$

Stated differently, under the assumption that the underlying random variable $X$ is normally distributed, it can be shown that $\sqrt{n} g_2 \,\xrightarrow{d}\, \mathcal{N}(0, 24)$.

== Applications ==
The sample kurtosis is a useful measure of whether there is a problem with outliers in a data set. Larger kurtosis indicates a more serious outlier problem, and may lead the researcher to choose alternative statistical methods.

D'Agostino's K-squared test is a goodness-of-fit normality test based on a combination of the sample skewness and sample kurtosis, as is the Jarque–Bera test for normality.

For non-normal samples, the variance of the sample variance depends on the kurtosis; for details, please see variance.

Pearson's definition of kurtosis is used as an indicator of intermittency in turbulence. It is also used in magnetic resonance imaging to quantify non-Gaussian diffusion.

A concrete example is the following lemma by He, Zhang, and Zhang: Assume a random variable X has expectation $\operatorname{E}[X] = \mu$, variance $\operatorname{E}\left[(X - \mu)^2\right] = \sigma^2$ and kurtosis $\kappa = \tfrac{1}{\sigma^4} \operatorname{E}\left[(X - \mu)^4\right].$ Assume we sample $n = \tfrac{2\sqrt{3} + 3}{3} \kappa \log\tfrac{1}{\delta}$ many independent copies. Then
$$\begin{align}
&\Pr\left[\max_{i=1}^n X_i \le \mu\right] \le \delta\\[4pt]
&\text{and}\\[4pt]
& \Pr\left[\min_{i=1}^n X_i \ge \mu\right] \le \delta.
\end{align}$$

This shows that with $\Theta(\kappa\log\tfrac{1}\delta)$ many samples, we will see one that is above the expectation with probability at least $1-\delta$. In other words: If the kurtosis is large, there may be a lot of values either all below or above the mean.

=== Kurtosis convergence ===
Applying band-pass filters to digital images, kurtosis values tend to be uniform, independent of the range of the filter. This behavior, termed kurtosis convergence, can be used to detect image splicing in forensic analysis.

=== Seismic signal analysis ===
Kurtosis can be used in geophysics to distinguish different types of seismic signals. It is particularly effective in differentiating seismic signals generated by human footsteps from other signals. This is useful in security and surveillance systems that rely on seismic detection.

=== Weather prediction ===
In meteorology, kurtosis is used to analyze weather data distributions. It helps predict extreme weather events by assessing the probability of outlier values in historical data, which is valuable for long-term climate studies and short-term weather forecasting.

== Other measures ==
A different measure of kurtosis is provided by using L-moments instead of the ordinary moments.

== See also ==
- Kurtosis risk
- Maximum entropy probability distribution
