= Moment (mathematics) =

Measure of the shape of a function

In mathematics, moments of a function are certain quantitative measures related to the shape of the function's graph. For example, in physics, if the function represents mass density, then the zeroth moment is the total mass, the first moment is the center of mass (multiplied by total mass), and the second moment is the moment of inertia. In statistics, the function is a probability distribution, then the first moment is the expected value, the second central moment is the variance, the third standardized moment is the skewness, and the fourth standardized moment is the kurtosis.

For a distribution of mass or probability on a bounded interval, the collection of all the moments (of all orders, from 0 to ∞) uniquely determines the distribution (Hausdorff moment problem). The same is not true on unbounded intervals (Hamburger moment problem).

== Formulation ==
The nth moment of a real-valued continuous density function $f(x)$ about a reference value $c$ is the integral

$$\mu_n = \int_{-\infty}^\infty (x - c)^n\,f(x)\,\mathrm{d}x.$$

It is possible to define moments in a more general fashion than moments for real-valued functions – see moments in metric spaces. The moment of a function, without further explanation, usually refers to the above expression with $c=0$. For the second and higher moments, the central moment (moments about the mean, with c being the mean) are usually used rather than the moments about zero, because they provide clearer information about the distribution's shape.

== Properties ==
=== Transformation of center ===
Since
$$(x - b)^n = (x - a + a - b)^n = \sum_{i=0}^n {n \choose i}(x - a)^i(a - b)^{n-i}$$
where $\binom{n}{i}$ is the binomial coefficient, it follows that the moments about b can be calculated from the moments about a by:
$$E\left[(x - b)^n\right] = \sum_{i=0}^n {n \choose i} E\left[(x - a)^i\right](a - b)^{n-i}.$$

As a corollary of this result, the lowest nonzero moment is independent of the choice of center. We can see this from the formula above by considering the case where the ith moments (about some point a) are zero for all $i < n$.

=== Moment of a convolution of function ===
The raw moment of a convolution $h(t) = (f * g)(t) = \int_{-\infty}^\infty f(\tau) g(t - \tau) \, d\tau$ reads
$$\mu_n[h] = \sum_{i=0}^{n} {n\choose i} \mu_i[f] \mu_{n-i}[g]$$
where $\mu_n[\,\cdot\,]$ denotes the $n$th moment of the function given in the brackets. This identity follows by the convolution theorem for moment generating function and applying the chain rule for differentiating a product.

== Partial moments ==
Partial moments are sometimes referred to as "one-sided moments". The nth order lower and upper partial moments with respect to a reference point r may be expressed as
$$\mu_n^- (r) = \int_{-\infty}^r (r - x)^n\,f(x)\,\mathrm{d}x,$$
$$\mu_n^+ (r) = \int_r^\infty (x - r)^n\,f(x)\,\mathrm{d}x.$$

If the integral function does not converge, the partial moment does not exist.

Partial moments are normalized by being raised to the power 1/n. The upside potential ratio may be expressed as a ratio of a first-order upper partial moment to a normalized second-order lower partial moment.

== Central moments in metric spaces ==
Let (M, d) be a metric space, and let B(M) be the Borel σ-algebra on M, the σ-algebra generated by the d-open subsets of M. (For technical reasons, it is also convenient to assume that M is a separable space with respect to the metric d.) Let 1 ≤ p ≤ ∞.

The pth central moment of a measure μ on the measurable space (M, B(M)) about a given point x_{0} ∈ M is defined to be
$$\int_{M} d\left(x, x_0\right)^p \, \mathrm{d} \mu (x).$$

μ is said to have finite pth central moment if the pth central moment of μ about x_{0} is finite for some x_{0} ∈ M.

This terminology for measures carries over to random variables in the usual way: if (Ω, Σ, P) is a probability space and X : Ω → M is a random variable, then the pth central moment of X about x_{0} ∈ M is defined to be
$$\int_M d \left(x, x_0\right)^p \, \mathrm{d} \left( X_* \left(\mathbf{P}\right) \right) (x) =
\int_\Omega d \left(X(\omega), x_0\right)^p \, \mathrm{d} \mathbf{P} (\omega) =
\operatorname{\mathbf{E}}[d(X, x_0)^p],$$
and X has finite pth central moment if the pth central moment of X about x_{0} is finite for some x_{0} ∈ M.

== See also ==
- Cumulant
- Energy (signal processing)
- Factorial moment
- Generalised mean
- Image moment
- L-moment
- Moment-generating function
- Moment measure
- Second moment method
- Stieltjes moment problem
