= Central moment =

Moment of a random variable minus its mean

In probability theory and statistics, a central moment is a moment of a probability distribution of a random variable about the random variable's mean; that is, it is the expected value of a specified integer power of the deviation of the random variable from the mean. The various moments form one set of values by which the properties of a probability distribution can be usefully characterized. Central moments are used in preference to ordinary moments, computed in terms of deviations from the mean instead of from zero, because the higher-order central moments relate only to the spread and shape of the distribution, rather than also to its location.

Sets of central moments can be defined for both univariate and multivariate distributions.

== Univariate moments ==
The n-th moment about the mean (or n-th central moment) of a real-valued random variable X is the quantity μ_{n} := E[(X − E[X])^{n}], where E is the expectation operator. For a continuous univariate probability distribution with probability density function f(x), the n-th moment about the mean μ is
$$\mu_n = \operatorname{E} \left[ {\left( X - \operatorname{E}[X] \right)}^n \right] = \int_{-\infty}^{+\infty} (x - \mu)^n f(x)\,\mathrm{d} x.$$

For random variables that have no mean, such as the Cauchy distribution, central moments are not defined.

The first few central moments have intuitive interpretations:

- The "zeroth" central moment μ_{0} is 1.
- The first central moment μ_{1} is 0 (not to be confused with the first raw moment or the expected value μ).
- The second central moment μ_{2} is called the variance, and is usually denoted σ^{2}, where σ represents the standard deviation.
- The third and fourth central moments are used to define the standardized moments which are used to define skewness and kurtosis, respectively.

=== Properties ===
For all n, the n-th central moment is homogeneous of degree n:

$$\mu_n(cX) = c^n \mu_n(X).\,$$

Only for n such that n equals 1, 2, or 3 do we have an additivity property for random variables X and Y that are independent:

$$\mu_n(X+Y) = \mu_n(X)+\mu_n(Y)\,$$
provided n ∈ {1, 2, 3}.

A related functional that shares the translation-invariance and homogeneity properties with the n-th central moment, but continues to have this additivity property even when n ≥ 4 is the n-th cumulant κ_{n}(X). For n = 1, the n-th cumulant is just the expected value; for n = either 2 or 3, the n-th cumulant is just the n-th central moment; for n ≥ 4, the n-th cumulant is an n-th-degree monic polynomial in the first n moments (about zero), and is also a (simpler) n-th-degree polynomial in the first n central moments.

=== Relation to moments about the origin ===
Sometimes it is convenient to convert moments about the origin to moments about the mean. The general equation for converting the n-th-order moment about the origin to the moment about the mean is

$$\mu_n = \operatorname{E}\left[\left(X - \operatorname{E}[X]\right)^n\right]
= \sum_{j=0}^n \binom{n}{j} {\left(-1\right)}^{n-j} \mu'_j \mu^{n-j},$$

where μ is the mean of the distribution, and the moment about the origin is given by

$$\mu'_m = \int_{-\infty}^{+\infty} x^m f(x)\,dx = \operatorname{E}[X^m] = \sum_{j=0}^m \binom{m}{j} \mu_j \mu^{m-j}.$$

For the cases n = 2, 3, 4 — which are of most interest because of the relations to variance, skewness, and kurtosis, respectively — this formula becomes (noting that $\mu = \mu'_1$ and $\mu'_0=1$):

$$\mu_2 = \mu'_2 - \mu^2\,$$
which is commonly referred to as $\operatorname{Var}(X) = \operatorname{E}[X^2] - \left(\operatorname{E}[X]\right)^2$

$$\begin{align}
\mu_3 &= \mu'_3 - 3 \mu \mu'_2 +2 \mu^3 \\
\mu_4 &= \mu'_4 - 4 \mu \mu'_3 + 6 \mu^2 \mu'_2 - 3 \mu^4.
\end{align}$$

... and so on, following Pascal's triangle, i.e.

$$\mu_5 = \mu'_5 - 5 \mu \mu'_4 + 10 \mu^2 \mu'_3 - 10 \mu^3 \mu'_2 + 4 \mu^5.\,$$

because $5\mu^4\mu'_1 - \mu^5 \mu'_0 = 5\mu^4\mu - \mu^5 = 5 \mu^5 - \mu^5 = 4 \mu^5$.

The following sum is a stochastic variable having a compound distribution

$$W = \sum_{i=1}^M Y_i,$$

where the $Y_i$ are mutually independent random variables sharing the same common distribution and $M$ a random integer variable independent of the $Y_k$ with its own distribution. The moments of $W$ are obtained as

$$\operatorname{E}[W^n]= \sum_{i=0}^n\operatorname{E}\left[\binom{M}{i}\right] \sum_{j=0}^i \binom{i}{j} {\left(-1\right)}^{i-j} \operatorname{E} \left[ \left(\sum_{k=1}^j Y_k\right)^n \right],$$

where $\operatorname{E} \left[ {\left(\sum_{k=1}^j Y_k\right)}^n\right]$ is defined as zero for $j = 0$.

=== Symmetric distributions ===
In distributions that are symmetric about their means (unaffected by being reflected about the mean), all odd central moments equal zero whenever they exist, because in the formula for the n-th moment, each term involving a value of X less than the mean by a certain amount exactly cancels out the term involving a value of X greater than the mean by the same amount.

== Multivariate moments ==
For a continuous bivariate probability distribution with probability density function f(x,y) the (j,k) moment about the mean μ = (μ_{X}, μ_{Y}) is
$$\begin{align}
\mu_{j,k} &= \operatorname{E} \left[ {\left( X - \operatorname{E}[X] \right)}^j {\left( Y - \operatorname{E}[Y] \right)}^k \right] \\[2pt]
&= \int_{-\infty}^{+\infty} \int_{-\infty}^{+\infty} {\left(x - \mu_X\right)}^j {\left(y - \mu_Y\right)}^k f(x,y) \, dx \, dy.
\end{align}$$

== Central moment of complex random variables ==
The n-th central moment for a complex random variable X is defined as

$\alpha_n = \operatorname{E} \left[ {\left( X - \operatorname{E}[X] \right)}^n \right],$

The absolute n-th central moment of X is defined as

$\beta_n = \operatorname{E} \left[ {\left|\left( X - \operatorname{E}[X] \right)\right|}^n \right].$

The 2nd-order central moment β_{2} is called the variance of X whereas the 2nd-order central moment α_{2} is the pseudo-variance of X.

== See also ==
- Standardized moment
- Image moment
- Normal distribution § Moments
- Complex random variable
