= Rectified Gaussian distribution =

Mixture of discrete and continuous distributions

In probability theory, the rectified Gaussian distribution is a modification of the Gaussian distribution when its negative elements are reset to 0 (analogous to an electronic rectifier). It is essentially a mixture of a discrete distribution (constant 0) and a continuous distribution (a truncated Gaussian distribution with interval $(0,\infty)$) as a result of censoring.

== Density function ==
The probability density function of a rectified Gaussian distribution, for which random variables X having this distribution, derived from the normal distribution $\mathcal{N}(\mu,\sigma^2),$ are displayed as $X \sim \mathcal{N}^{\textrm{R}}(\mu,\sigma^2)$, is given by
$$f(x;\mu,\sigma^2) =\Phi{\left(-\frac{\mu}{\sigma}\right)}\delta(x)+ \frac{1}{\sqrt{2\pi\sigma^2}}\; e^{ -\frac{(x-\mu)^2}{2\sigma^2}}\textrm{U}(x).$$

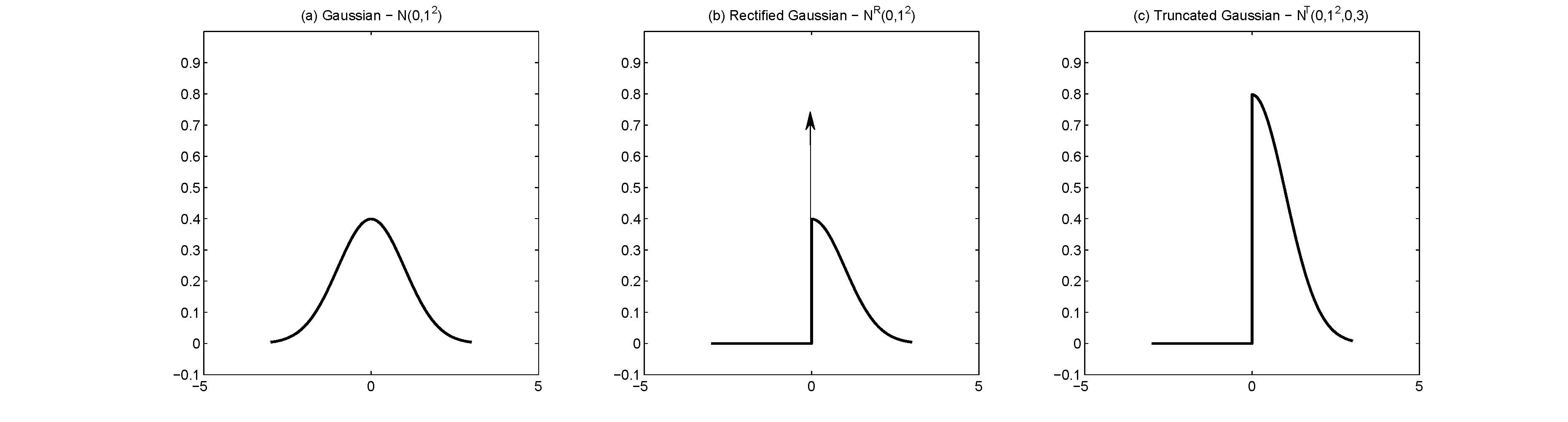
A comparison of Gaussian distribution, rectified Gaussian distribution, and truncated Gaussian distribution.

Here, $\Phi(x)$ is the cumulative distribution function (cdf) of the standard normal distribution:
$$\Phi(x) = \frac{1}{\sqrt{2\pi}} \int_{-\infty}^x e^{-t^2/2} \, dt
\quad x\in\mathbb{R},$$
$\delta(x)$ is the Dirac delta function
$$\delta(x) = \begin{cases} +\infty, & x = 0 \\ 0, & x \ne 0 \end{cases}$$
and, $\textrm{U}(x)$ is the unit step function:
$$\textrm{U}(x) = \begin{cases} 0, & x \leq 0, \\ 1, & x > 0. \end{cases}$$

== Mean and variance ==
Since the unrectified normal distribution has mean $\mu$ and since in transforming it to the rectified distribution some probability mass has been shifted to a higher value (from negative values to 0), the mean of the rectified distribution is greater than $\mu.$

Since the rectified distribution is formed by moving some of the probability mass toward the rest of the probability mass, the rectification is a mean-preserving contraction combined with a mean-changing rigid shift of the distribution, and thus the variance is decreased; therefore the variance of the rectified distribution is less than $\sigma^2.$

== Generating values ==
To generate values computationally, one can use

$$s\sim\mathcal{N}(\mu,\sigma^2), \quad x=\textrm{max}(0,s),$$

and then

$$x\sim\mathcal{N}^{\textrm{R}}(\mu,\sigma^2).$$

== Application ==
A rectified Gaussian distribution is semi-conjugate to the Gaussian likelihood, and it has been recently applied to factor analysis, or particularly, (non-negative) rectified factor analysis. Harva proposed a variational learning algorithm for the rectified factor model, where the factors follow a mixture of rectified Gaussian; and later Meng proposed an infinite rectified factor model coupled with its Gibbs sampling solution, where the factors follow a Dirichlet process mixture of rectified Gaussian distribution, and applied it in computational biology for reconstruction of gene regulatory networks.

== Extension to general bounds ==
An extension to the rectified Gaussian distribution was proposed by Palmer et al., allowing rectification between arbitrary lower and upper bounds. For lower and upper bounds $a$ and $b$ respectively, the cdf, $F_{R}(x|\mu,\sigma^2)$ is given by:

$$F_{R}(x|\mu,\sigma^2) = \begin{cases}
0, & x < a,\\
\Phi(x|\mu,\sigma^2),  & a \le x < b, \\
1, & x \ge b,\\
\end{cases}$$

where $\Phi(x|\mu,\sigma^2)$ is the cdf of a normal distribution with mean $\mu$ and variance $\sigma^2$. The mean and variance of the rectified distribution is calculated by first transforming the constraints to be acting on a standard normal distribution:

$$c = \frac{a - \mu}{\sigma}, \qquad d = \frac{b - \mu}{\sigma}.$$

Using the transformed constraints, the mean and variance, $\mu_{R}$ and $\sigma^2_{R}$ respectively, are then given by:

$$\mu_{t} = \frac{1}{\sqrt{2\pi}} \left(e^\left( -\frac{c^{2}}{2}\right) - e^\left( -\frac{d^{2}}{2}\right)\right) + \frac{c}{2}\left(1 + \textrm{erf}\left( \frac{c}{\sqrt{2}}\right) \right) + \frac{d}{2}\left(1 - \textrm{erf}\left( \frac{d}{\sqrt{2}}\right) \right),$$

$$\begin{align}
\sigma_{t}^{2} & = \frac{\mu_{t}^{2} + 1}{2}\left(\textrm{erf}\left(\frac{d}{\sqrt{2}}\right) - \textrm{erf}\left(\frac{c}{\sqrt{2}}\right) \right) - \frac{1}{\sqrt{2\pi}}\left(\left(d-2\mu_{t}\right) e^\left(-\frac{d^{2}}{2}\right) - \left(c-2\mu_{t}\right)e^\left(-\frac{c^{2}}{2}\right)\right) \\
&+ \frac{\left(c - \mu_{t}\right)^{2}}{2}\left(1 + \textrm{erf}\left(\frac{c}{\sqrt{2}}\right)\right) + \frac{\left(d - \mu_{t}\right)^{2}}{2}\left(1 - \textrm{erf}\left(\frac{d}{\sqrt{2}}\right)\right),
\end{align}$$

$$\mu_{R} = \mu + \sigma\mu_{t},$$

$$\sigma^2_{R} = \sigma^2\sigma_{t}^2,$$

where erf is the error function. This distribution was used by Palmer et al. for modelling physical resource levels, such as the quantity of liquid in a vessel, which is bounded by both 0 and the capacity of the vessel.

== See also ==
- Folded normal distribution
- Half-normal distribution
- Half-t distribution
- Truncated normal distribution
