= Folded-t and half-t distributions =

In statistics, the folded-t and half-t distributions are derived from Student's t-distribution by taking the absolute values of variates. This is analogous to the folded-normal and the half-normal statistical distributions being derived from the normal distribution.

== Definitions ==
The folded non-standardized t distribution is the distribution of the absolute value of the non-standardized t distribution with $\nu$ degrees of freedom; its probability density function is given by:

$$g\left(x\right)\;=\;\frac{\Gamma\left(\frac{\nu+1}{2}\right)}{\Gamma\left(\frac{\nu}{2}\right)\sqrt{\nu\pi\sigma^2}}\left\lbrace
\left[1+\frac{1}{\nu}\frac{\left(x-\mu\right)^2}{\sigma^2}\right]^{-\frac{\nu+1}{2}}+\left[1+\frac{1}{\nu}\frac{\left(x+\mu\right)^2}{\sigma^2}\right]^{-\frac{\nu+1}{2}} \right\rbrace \qquad(\mbox{for}\quad x \geq 0)$$.

The half-t distribution results as the special case of $\mu=0$, and the standardized version as the special case of $\sigma=1$.

If $\mu=0$, the folded-t distribution reduces to the special case of the half-t distribution. Its probability density function then simplifies to

$$g\left(x\right)\;=\;\frac{2\;\Gamma\left(\frac{\nu+1}{2}\right)}{\Gamma\left(\frac{\nu}{2}\right)\sqrt{\nu\pi\sigma^2}}
\left(1+\frac{1}{\nu}\frac{x^2}{\sigma^2}\right)^{-\frac{\nu+1}{2}} \qquad(\mbox{for}\quad x \geq 0)$$.

The half-t distribution's first two moments (expectation and variance) are given by:

$$\operatorname{E}[X]\;=\;2\sigma\sqrt{\frac{\nu}{\pi}}\frac{\Gamma(\frac{\nu+1}{2})}{\Gamma(\frac{\nu}{2})\,(\nu-1)} \qquad\mbox{for}\quad \nu > 1$$,

and

$$\operatorname{Var}(X)\;=\;\sigma^2\left(\frac{\nu}{\nu-2}-\frac{4\nu}{\pi(\nu-1)^2}\left(\frac{\Gamma(\frac{\nu+1}{2})}{\Gamma(\frac{\nu}{2})}\right)^2\right) \qquad\mbox{for}\quad \nu > 2$$.

== Relation to other distributions ==
Folded-t and half-t generalize the folded normal and half-normal distributions by allowing for finite degrees-of-freedom (the normal analogues constitute the limiting cases of infinite degrees-of-freedom). Since the Cauchy distribution constitutes the special case of a Student-t distribution with one degree of freedom, the families of folded and half-t distributions include the folded Cauchy distribution and half-Cauchy distributions for $\nu=1$.

== See also ==
- Folded normal distribution
- Half-normal distribution
- Half-logistic distribution
