= Kaniadakis exponential distribution =

Probability distribution

The Kaniadakis exponential distribution (or κ-exponential distribution) is a probability distribution arising from the maximization of the Kaniadakis entropy under appropriate constraints. It is one example of a Kaniadakis distribution. The κ-exponential is a generalization of the exponential distribution in the same way that Kaniadakis entropy is a generalization of standard Boltzmann–Gibbs entropy or Shannon entropy. The κ-exponential distribution of Type I is a particular case of the κ-Gamma distribution, whilst the κ-exponential distribution of Type II is a particular case of the κ-Weibull distribution.

== Type I ==
=== Probability density function ===
κ-exponential distribution of type I
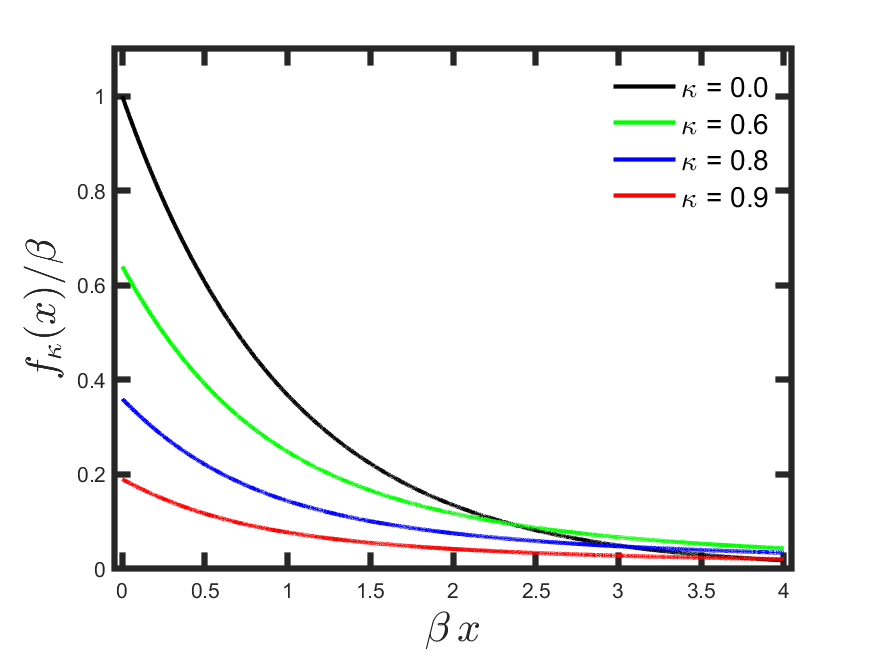
- Probability density function

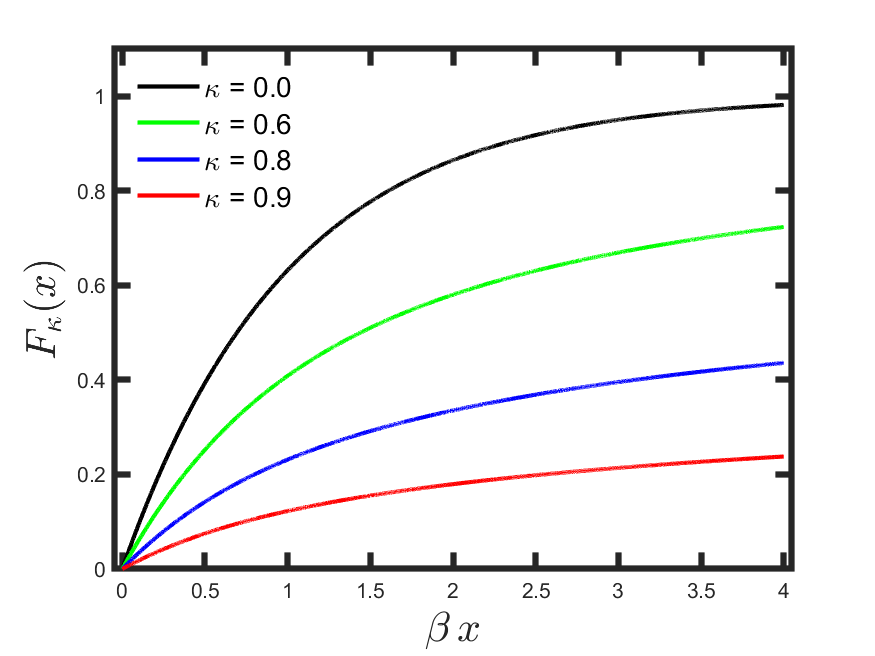
- Cumulative distribution function
- Parameters: $0 < \kappa < 1$ shape (real) $\beta> 0$ rate (real)
- Support: $x \in [0, \infty)$
- PDF: $(1 - \kappa^2) \beta \exp_\kappa(-\beta x)$
- CDF: $1-\Big(\sqrt{1+\kappa^2\beta^2 x^2} + \kappa^2 \beta x \Big)\exp_k({-\beta x)}$
- Mean: $\frac{1}{\beta} \frac{1 - \kappa^2}{1 - 4\kappa^2}$
- Variance: $\sigma_\kappa^2 =\frac{1}{\beta^2} \frac{2(1-4\kappa^2)^2 - (1 - \kappa^2)^2(1-9\kappa^2)}{(1-4\kappa^2)^2(1-9\kappa^2)}$
- Skewness: $\frac{ 2 (1-\kappa^2) (144 \kappa^8+23 \kappa^6+27 \kappa^4-6 \kappa^2+1) }{ \beta^3 \sigma^3_\kappa (4 \kappa^2-1)^3 (144 \kappa^4-25 \kappa^2+1) }$
- Excess kurtosis: $\frac{ 9(1200\kappa^{14} - 6123\kappa^{12} + 562\kappa^{10} +1539 \kappa^8 - 544 \kappa^6 + 143 \kappa^4 -18\kappa^2 + 1 )}{ \beta^4 \sigma_\kappa^4 (1-\kappa^2)^{-1}(1 - 4\kappa^2)^4 (3600\kappa^8 -4369\kappa^6 + 819\kappa^4 - 51\kappa^2 + 1) } - 3$
- Method of moments: $\frac{1 - \kappa^2}{\prod_{n=0}^{m+1} [1-(2n-m-1) \kappa ]} \frac{m!}{\beta^m}$

The Kaniadakis κ-exponential distribution of Type I is part of a class of statistical distributions emerging from the Kaniadakis κ-statistics which exhibit power-law tails. This distribution has the following probability density function:

$$f_{_{\kappa}}(x) = (1 - \kappa^2) \beta \exp_\kappa(-\beta x)$$

valid for $x \ge 0$, where $0 \leq |\kappa| < 1$ is the entropic index associated with the Kaniadakis entropy and $\beta > 0$ is known as rate parameter. The exponential distribution is recovered as $\kappa \rightarrow 0.$

=== Cumulative distribution function ===
The cumulative distribution function of κ-exponential distribution of Type I is given by

$$F_\kappa(x) = 1-\Big(\sqrt{1+\kappa^2\beta^2 x^2} + \kappa^2 \beta x \Big)\exp_k({-\beta x)}$$

for $x \ge 0$. The cumulative exponential distribution is recovered in the classical limit $\kappa \rightarrow 0$.

=== Properties ===
==== Moments, expectation value and variance ====
The κ-exponential distribution of type I has moment of order $m \in \mathbb{N}$ given by

$$\operatorname{E}[X^m] = \frac{1 - \kappa^2}{\prod_{n=0}^{m+1} [1-(2n-m-1) \kappa ]} \frac{m!}{\beta^m}$$

where $f_\kappa(x)$ is finite if $0 < m + 1 < 1/\kappa$.

The expectation is defined as:

$$\operatorname{E}[X] = \frac{1}{\beta} \frac{1 - \kappa^2}{1 - 4\kappa^2}$$

and the variance is:

$$\operatorname{Var}[X] = \sigma_\kappa^2 = \frac{1}{\beta^2} \frac{2(1-4\kappa^2)^2 - (1 - \kappa^2)^2(1-9\kappa^2)}{(1-4\kappa^2)^2(1-9\kappa^2)}$$

==== Kurtosis ====
The kurtosis of the κ-exponential distribution of type I may be computed thought:

$$\operatorname{Kurt}[X] = \operatorname{E}\left[\frac{\left[ X - \frac{1}{\beta} \frac{1 - \kappa^2}{1 - 4\kappa^2}\right]^4}{\sigma_\kappa^4}\right]$$

Thus, the kurtosis of the κ-exponential distribution of type I distribution is given by:

$\operatorname{Kurt}[X] = \frac{ 9(1-\kappa^2)(1200\kappa^{14} - 6123\kappa^{12} + 562\kappa^{10} +1539 \kappa^8 - 544 \kappa^6 + 143 \kappa^4 -18\kappa^2 + 1 )}{ \beta^4 \sigma_\kappa^4 (1 - 4\kappa^2)^4 (3600\kappa^8 -4369\kappa^6 + 819\kappa^4 - 51\kappa^2 + 1) } \quad \text{for} \quad 0 \leq \kappa < 1/5$

or

$\operatorname{Kurt}[X] = \frac{ 9(9\kappa^2-1)^2(\kappa^2-1)(1200\kappa^{14} - 6123\kappa^{12} + 562\kappa^{10} +1539 \kappa^8 - 544 \kappa^6 + 143 \kappa^4 -18\kappa^2 + 1 )}{ \beta^2 (1 - 4\kappa^2)^2(9\kappa^6 + 13\kappa^4 - 5\kappa^2 +1)(3600\kappa^8 -4369\kappa^6 + 819\kappa^4 - 51\kappa^2 + 1) } \quad \text{for} \quad 0 \leq \kappa < 1/5$

The kurtosis of the ordinary exponential distribution is recovered in the limit $\kappa \rightarrow 0$.

==== Skewness ====
The skewness of the κ-exponential distribution of type I may be computed thought:

$$\operatorname{Skew}[X] = \operatorname{E}\left[\frac{\left[ X - \frac{1}{\beta} \frac{1 - \kappa^2}{1 - 4\kappa^2}\right]^3}{\sigma_\kappa^3}\right]$$

Thus, the skewness of the κ-exponential distribution of type I distribution is given by:

$\operatorname{Shew}[X] = \frac{ 2 (1-\kappa^2) (144 \kappa^8+23 \kappa^6+27 \kappa^4-6 \kappa^2+1) }{ \beta^3 \sigma^3_\kappa (4 \kappa^2-1)^3 (144 \kappa^4-25 \kappa^2+1) } \quad \text{for} \quad 0 \leq \kappa < 1/4$

The kurtosis of the ordinary exponential distribution is recovered in the limit $\kappa \rightarrow 0$.

== Type II ==
=== Probability density function ===
κ-exponential distribution of type II
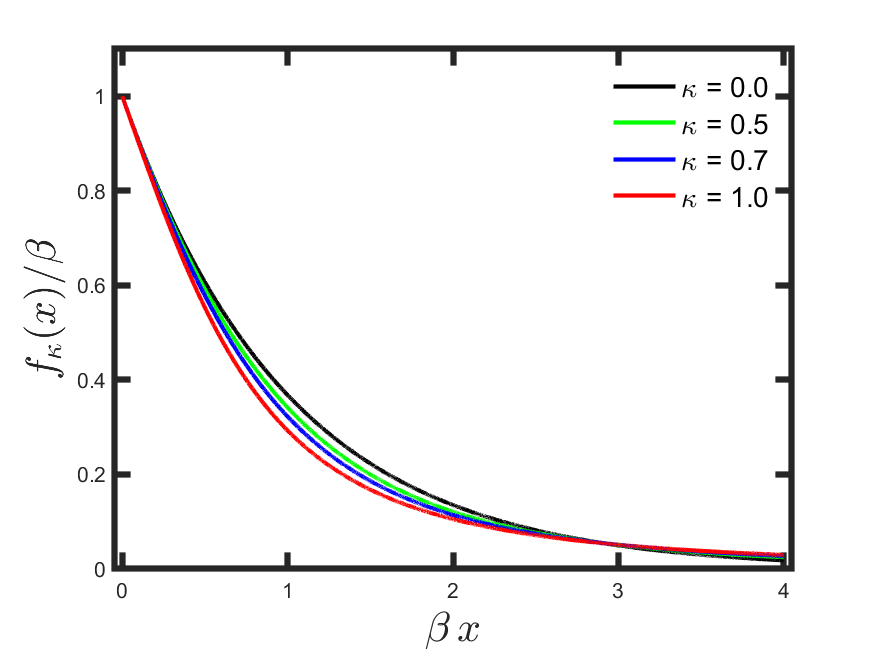
- Probability density function

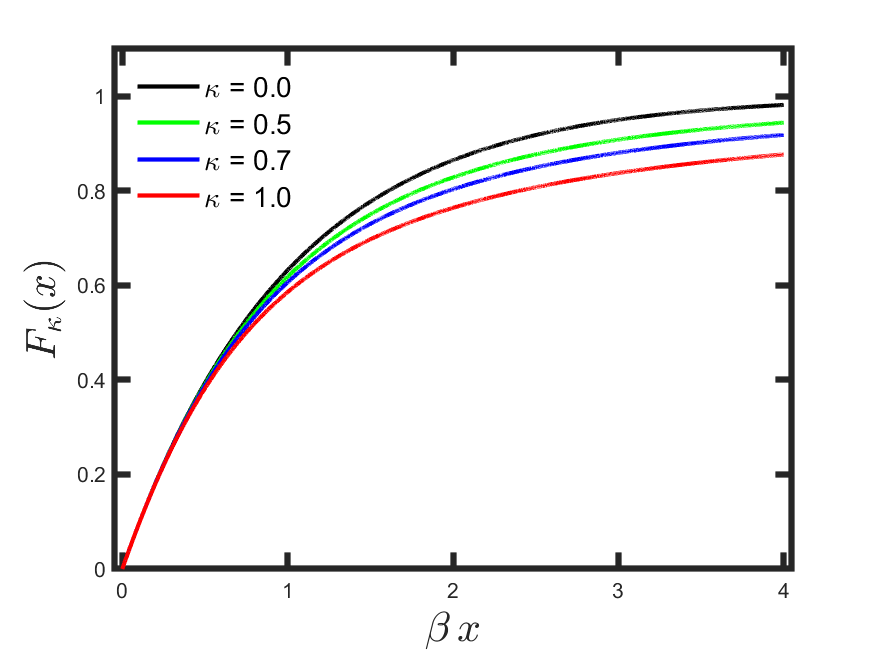
- Cumulative distribution function
- Parameters: $0 \leq \kappa < 1$ shape (real) $\beta> 0$ rate (real)
- Support: $x \in [0, \infty)$
- PDF: $\frac{ \beta }{ \sqrt{1+ \kappa^2 \beta^2 x^2 } } \exp_\kappa(- \beta x)$
- CDF: $1-\exp_k({-\beta x)}$
- Quantile: $\beta^{-1} \ln_\kappa \Bigg(\frac{1}{1 - F_\kappa} \Bigg) , 0 \leq F_\kappa \leq 1$
- Mean: $\frac{1}{\beta} \frac{1}{1 - \kappa^2}$
- Median: $\beta^{-1} \ln_\kappa (2)$
- Mode: $\frac{ 1 }{ \kappa \beta \sqrt{ 2 (1 - \kappa^2) } }$
- Variance: $\sigma_\kappa^2 = \frac{1}{\beta^2} \frac{1+2 \kappa^4}{(1-4\kappa^2)(1-\kappa^2)^2}$
- Skewness: $\frac{ 2 (15 \kappa^6+6 \kappa^4+2 \kappa^2+1) }{ (1 - 9\kappa^2)(2 \kappa^4 + 1) } \sqrt{ \frac{1 - 4\kappa^2 }{ 1 + 2\kappa^4 } }$
- Excess kurtosis: $\frac{3 (72 \kappa^{10} - 360 \kappa^8 - 44 \kappa^6-32 \kappa^4+7 \kappa^2-3) }{ (4\kappa^2-1)^{-1} (2 \kappa^4+1)^2 (144 \kappa^4-25 \kappa^2+1) }$
- Method of moments: $\frac{\beta^{-m} m!}{\prod_{n=0}^{m} [1-(2n- m) \kappa ]}$

The Kaniadakis κ-exponential distribution of Type II also is part of a class of statistical distributions emerging from the Kaniadakis κ-statistics which exhibit power-law tails, but with different constraints. This distribution is a particular case of the Kaniadakis κ-Weibull distribution with $\alpha = 1$ is:

$$f_{_{\kappa}}(x) =
\frac{\beta}{\sqrt{1+\kappa^2 \beta^2 x^2}}
\exp_\kappa(-\beta x)$$

valid for $x \ge 0$, where $0 \leq |\kappa| < 1$ is the entropic index associated with the Kaniadakis entropy and $\beta > 0$ is known as rate parameter.

The exponential distribution is recovered as $\kappa \rightarrow 0.$

=== Cumulative distribution function ===
The cumulative distribution function of κ-exponential distribution of Type II is given by

$$F_\kappa(x) =
1-\exp_k({-\beta x)}$$

for $x \ge 0$. The cumulative exponential distribution is recovered in the classical limit $\kappa \rightarrow 0$.

=== Properties ===
==== Moments, expectation value and variance ====
The κ-exponential distribution of type II has moment of order $m < 1/\kappa$ given by

$$\operatorname{E}[X^m] = \frac{\beta^{-m} m!}{\prod_{n=0}^{m} [1-(2n- m) \kappa ]}$$

The expectation value and the variance are:

$$\operatorname{E}[X] = \frac{1}{\beta} \frac{1}{1 - \kappa^2}$$

$$\operatorname{Var}[X] = \sigma_\kappa^2 = \frac{1}{\beta^2} \frac{1+2 \kappa^4}{(1-4\kappa^2)(1-\kappa^2)^2}$$

The mode is given by:

$$x_{\textrm{mode}} = \frac{1}{\kappa \beta\sqrt{2(1-\kappa^2)}}$$

==== Kurtosis ====
The kurtosis of the κ-exponential distribution of type II may be computed thought:

$$\operatorname{Kurt}[X] = \operatorname{E}\left[\left(\frac{X - \frac{1}{\beta} \frac{1}{1 - \kappa^2} }{\sigma_\kappa} \right)^4 \right]$$

Thus, the kurtosis of the κ-exponential distribution of type II distribution is given by:

$$\operatorname{Kurt}[X] = \frac{3 (72 \kappa^{10} - 360 \kappa^8 - 44 \kappa^6-32 \kappa^4+7 \kappa^2-3) }{ \beta^4  \sigma_\kappa^4 (\kappa^2 - 1)^4 (576 \kappa^6 - 244 \kappa^4 + 29 \kappa^2 - 1) } \quad \text{ for } \quad  0 \leq \kappa < 1/4$$

or

$$\operatorname{Kurt}[X] = \frac{3 (72 \kappa^{10} - 360 \kappa^8 - 44 \kappa^6-32 \kappa^4+7 \kappa^2-3) }{ (4\kappa^2-1)^{-1} (2 \kappa^4+1)^2 (144 \kappa^4-25 \kappa^2+1) } \quad \text{ for } \quad  0 \leq \kappa < 1/4$$

==== Skewness ====
The skewness of the κ-exponential distribution of type II may be computed thought:

$$\operatorname{Skew}[X] = \operatorname{E}\left[\frac{\left[ X - \frac{1}{\beta} \frac{1}{1 - \kappa^2}\right]^3}{\sigma_\kappa^3}\right]$$

Thus, the skewness of the κ-exponential distribution of type II distribution is given by:

$\operatorname{Skew}[X] = -\frac{ 2 (15 \kappa^6+6 \kappa^4+2 \kappa^2+1) }{ \beta^3 \sigma_\kappa^3 (\kappa^2 - 1)^3 (36 \kappa^4 - 13 \kappa^2 + 1) } \quad \text{for} \quad 0 \leq \kappa < 1/3$

or

$\operatorname{Skew}[X] = \frac{ 2 (15 \kappa^6+6 \kappa^4+2 \kappa^2+1) }{ (1 - 9\kappa^2)(2 \kappa^4 + 1) } \sqrt{ \frac{1 - 4\kappa^2 }{ 1 + 2\kappa^4 } } \quad \text{for} \quad 0 \leq \kappa < 1/3$

The skewness of the ordinary exponential distribution is recovered in the limit $\kappa \rightarrow 0$.

==== Quantiles ====
The quantiles are given by the following expression

$x_{\textrm{quantile}} (F_\kappa) = \beta^{-1} \ln_\kappa \Bigg(\frac{1}{1 - F_\kappa} \Bigg)$

with $0 \leq F_\kappa \leq 1$, in which the median is the case :

$x_{\textrm{median}} (F_\kappa) = \beta^{-1} \ln_\kappa (2)$

==== Lorenz curve ====
The Lorenz curve associated with the κ-exponential distribution of type II is given by:

$$\mathcal{L}_\kappa(F_\kappa) = 1 + \frac{1 - \kappa}{2 \kappa}(1 - F_\kappa)^{1 + \kappa} - \frac{1 + \kappa}{2 \kappa}(1 - F_\kappa)^{1 - \kappa}$$

The Gini coefficient is

$\operatorname{G}_\kappa = \frac{2 + \kappa^2}{4 - \kappa^2}$

==== Asymptotic behavior ====
The κ-exponential distribution of type II behaves asymptotically as follows:

$$\lim_{x \to +\infty} f_\kappa (x) \sim \kappa^{-1} (2 \kappa \beta)^{-1/\kappa} x^{(-1 - \kappa)/\kappa}$$
$$\lim_{x \to 0^+} f_\kappa (x) = \beta$$

== Applications ==
The κ-exponential distribution has been applied in several areas, such as:

- In geomechanics, for analyzing the properties of rock masses;
- In quantum theory, in physical analysis using Planck's radiation law;
- In inverse problems, the κ-exponential distribution has been used to formulate a robust approach;
- In Network theory.

== See also ==
- Giorgio Kaniadakis
- Kaniadakis statistics
- Kaniadakis distribution
- Kaniadakis κ-Gaussian distribution
- Kaniadakis κ-Gamma distribution
- Kaniadakis κ-Weibull distribution
- Kaniadakis κ-Logistic distribution
- Kaniadakis κ-Erlang distribution
- Exponential distribution
