= Kaniadakis distribution =

Continuous probability distribution

In statistics, a Kaniadakis distribution (also known as κ-distribution) is a statistical distribution that emerges from the Kaniadakis statistics. There are several families of Kaniadakis distributions related to different constraints used in the maximization of the Kaniadakis entropy, such as the κ-Exponential distribution, κ-Gaussian distribution, Kaniadakis κ-Gamma distribution and κ-Weibull distribution. The κ-distributions have been applied for modeling a vast phenomenology of experimental statistical distributions in natural or artificial complex systems, such as, in epidemiology, quantum statistics, in astrophysics and cosmology, in geophysics, in economy, in machine learning.

The κ-distributions are written as function of the κ-deformed exponential, taking the form

$$f_i=\exp_{\kappa}(-\beta E_i+\beta \mu)$$

enables the power-law description of complex systems following the consistent κ-generalized statistical theory., where $\exp_{\kappa}(x)=(\sqrt{1+ \kappa^2 x^2}+\kappa x)^{1/\kappa}$ is the Kaniadakis κ-exponential function.

The κ-distribution becomes the common Boltzmann distribution at low energies, while it has a power-law tail at high energies, the feature of high interest of many researchers.

== List of κ-statistical distributions ==
=== Supported on the whole real line ===
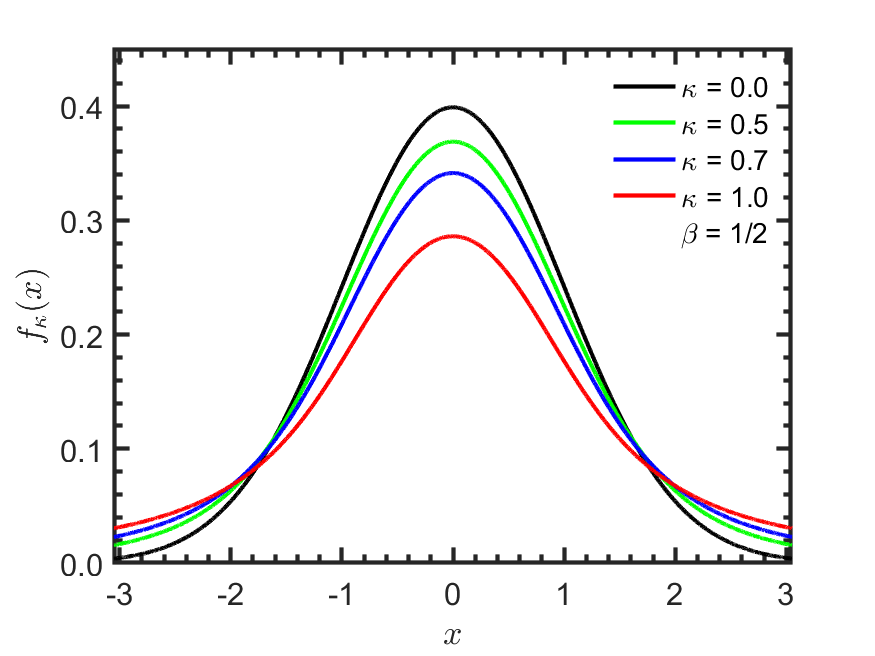
Plot of the κ-Gaussian distribution for typical κ-values. The case κ=0 corresponds to the normal distribution.

- The Kaniadakis Gaussian distribution, also called the κ-Gaussian distribution. The normal distribution is a particular case when $\kappa \rightarrow 0.$
- The Kaniadakis double exponential distribution, as known as Kaniadakis κ-double exponential distribution or κ-Laplace distribution. The Laplace distribution is a particular case when $\kappa \rightarrow 0.$

=== Supported on semi-infinite intervals, usually [0,∞) ===
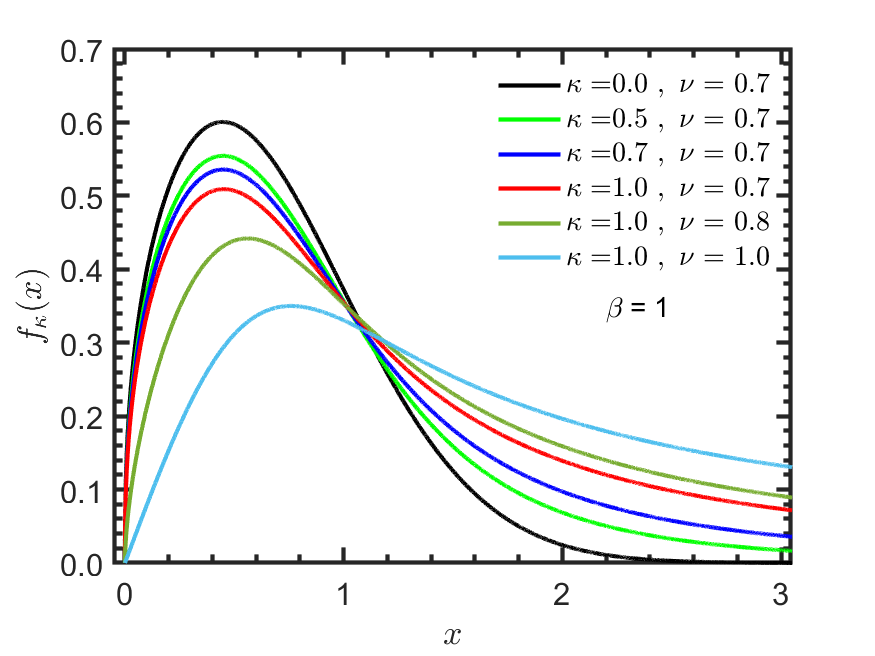
Plot of the κ-Gamma distribution for typical κ-values.

- The Kaniadakis Exponential distribution, also called the κ-Exponential distribution. The exponential distribution is a particular case when $\kappa \rightarrow 0.$
- The Kaniadakis Gamma distribution, also called the κ-Gamma distribution, which is a four-parameter ($\kappa, \alpha, \beta, \nu$) deformation of the generalized Gamma distribution.
  - The κ-Gamma distribution becomes a ...
    - κ-Exponential distribution of Type I when $\alpha = \nu = 1$.
    - κ-Erlang distribution when $\alpha = 1$ and $\nu = n =$ positive integer.
    - κ-Half-Normal distribution, when $\alpha = 2$ and $\nu = 1/2$.
    - Generalized Gamma distribution, when $\alpha = 1$;
  - In the limit $\kappa \rightarrow 0$, the κ-Gamma distribution becomes a ...
    - Erlang distribution, when $\alpha = 1$ and $\nu = n =$ positive integer;
    - Chi-Squared distribution, when $\alpha = 1$ and $\nu =$ half integer;
    - Nakagami distribution, when $\alpha = 2$ and $\nu > 0$;
    - Rayleigh distribution, when $\alpha = 2$ and $\nu = 1$;
    - Chi distribution, when $\alpha = 2$ and $\nu =$ half integer;
    - Maxwell distribution, when $\alpha = 2$ and $\nu = 3/2$;
    - Half-Normal distribution, when $\alpha = 2$ and $\nu = 1/2$;
    - Weibull distribution, when $\alpha > 0$ and $\nu = 1$;
    - Stretched Exponential distribution, when $\alpha > 0$ and $\nu = 1/\alpha$;

== Common Kaniadakis distributions ==
=== κ-Distribution Type IV ===
κ-Distribution Type IV
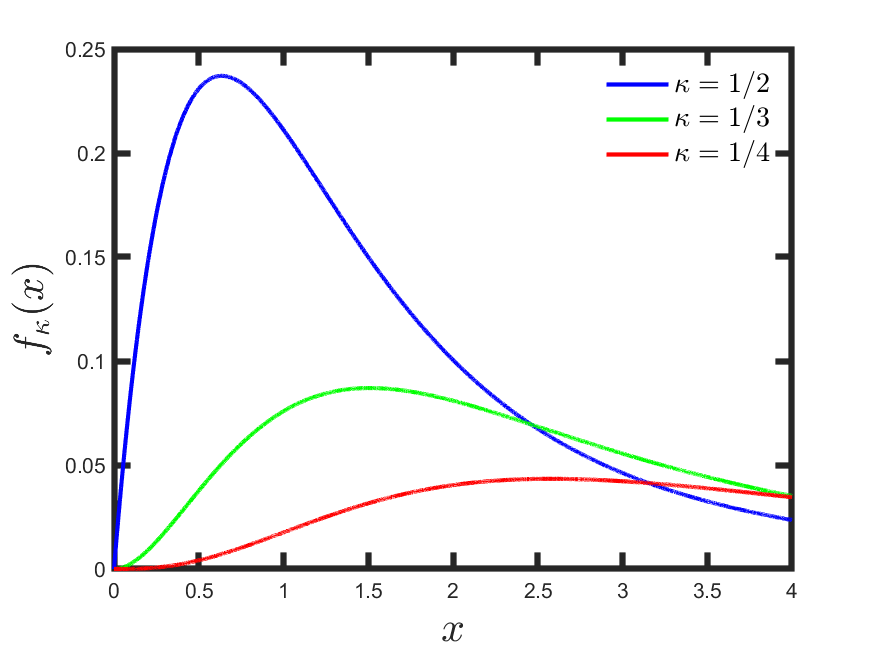
- Probability density function Plot of the κ-Distribution Type IV for typical κ-values, and $\alpha = \beta = 1$.

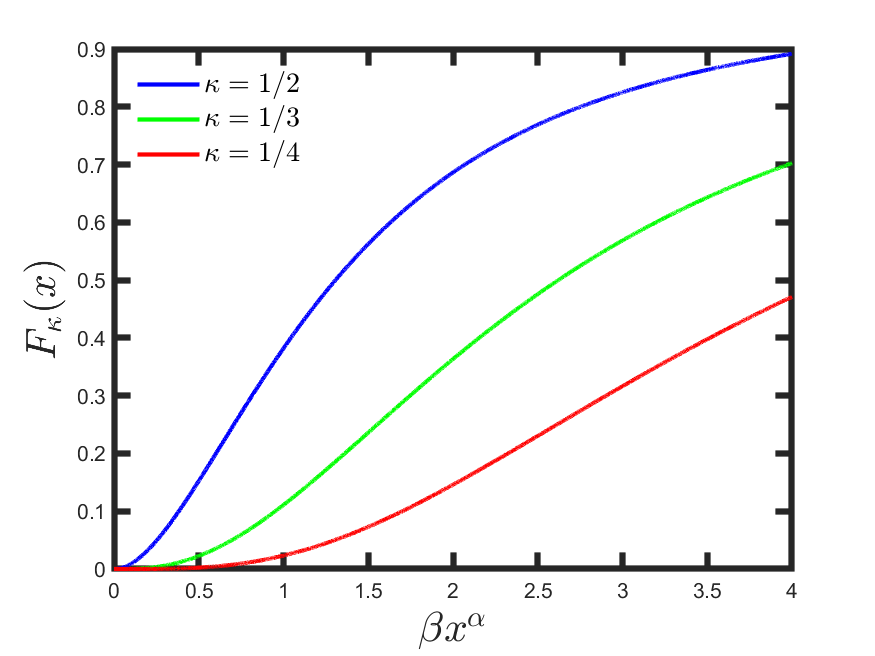
- Cumulative distribution function
- Parameters: $0 \leq \kappa < 1$ $\alpha > 0$ shape (real) $\beta> 0$ rate (real)
- Support: $x \in [0, +\infty)$
- PDF: $\frac{\alpha}{\kappa} (2\kappa \beta )^{1/\kappa } \left(1 - \frac{\kappa \beta x^\alpha}{\sqrt{1+\kappa^2\beta^2x^{2\alpha} } } \right) x^{ -1 + \alpha / \kappa} \exp_\kappa(-\beta x^\alpha)$
- CDF: $(2\kappa \beta )^{1/\kappa} x^{\alpha / \kappa} \exp_\kappa(-\beta x^\alpha)$
- Method of moments: $\frac{(2 \kappa \beta)^{-m/\alpha} }{ 1 + \kappa \frac{ m }{ 2\alpha } } \frac{\Gamma\Big(\frac{1}{\kappa} + \frac{m}{\alpha}\Big) \Gamma\Big(1 - \frac{m}{2\alpha}\Big)}{\Gamma\Big(\frac{1}{\kappa} + \frac{m}{2\alpha}\Big)}$

The Kaniadakis distribution of Type IV (or κ-Distribution Type IV) is a three-parameter family of continuous statistical distributions.

The κ-Distribution Type IV distribution has the following probability density function:

$$f_{_{\kappa}}(x) = \frac{\alpha}{\kappa} (2\kappa \beta )^{1/\kappa} \left(1 - \frac{\kappa \beta x^\alpha}{\sqrt{1+\kappa^2\beta^2x^{2\alpha} } } \right) x^{ -1 + \alpha / \kappa} \exp_\kappa(-\beta x^\alpha)$$

valid for $x \geq 0$, where $0 \leq |\kappa| < 1$ is the entropic index associated with the Kaniadakis entropy, $\beta > 0$ is the scale parameter, and $\alpha > 0$ is the shape parameter.

The cumulative distribution function of κ-Distribution Type IV assumes the form:

$$F_\kappa(x) = (2\kappa \beta )^{1/\kappa} x^{\alpha / \kappa} \exp_\kappa(-\beta x^\alpha)$$

The κ-Distribution Type IV does not admit a classical version, since the probability function and its cumulative reduces to zero in the classical limit $\kappa \rightarrow 0$.

Its moment of order $m$ given by

$$\operatorname{E}[X^m] = \frac{(2 \kappa \beta)^{-m/\alpha} }{ 1 + \kappa \frac{ m }{ 2\alpha } }  \frac{\Gamma\Big(\frac{1}{\kappa} + \frac{m}{\alpha}\Big) \Gamma\Big(1 - \frac{m}{2\alpha}\Big)}{\Gamma\Big(\frac{1}{\kappa} + \frac{m}{2\alpha}\Big)}$$

The moment of order $m$ of the κ-Distribution Type IV is finite for $m < 2\alpha$.

== See also ==
- Giorgio Kaniadakis
- Kaniadakis statistics
- Kaniadakis κ-Exponential distribution
- Kaniadakis κ-Gaussian distribution
- Kaniadakis κ-Gamma distribution
- Kaniadakis κ-Weibull distribution
- Kaniadakis κ-Logistic distribution
- Kaniadakis κ-Erlang distribution
