= Kaniadakis Gamma distribution =

Continuous probability distribution

κ-Gamma distribution
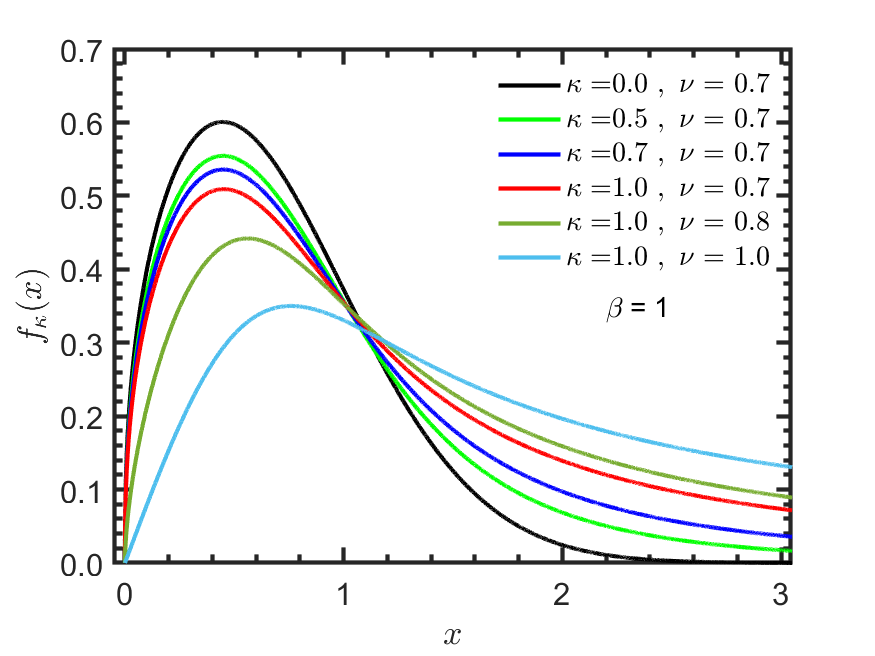
- Probability density function
- Parameters: $0 \leq \kappa < 1$ $\alpha > 0$ shape (real) $\beta> 0$ rate (real) $0 < \nu < 1/\kappa$
- Support: $x \in [0, +\infty)$
- PDF: $(1 + \kappa \nu) (2 \kappa)^\nu \frac{\Gamma \big(\frac{1}{2 \kappa} + \frac{\nu}{2} \big)}{\Gamma \big(\frac{1}{2 \kappa} - \frac{\nu}{2} \big)} \frac{\alpha \beta^\nu}{\Gamma \big(\nu\big)} x^{\alpha \nu - 1} \exp_\kappa(-\beta x^\alpha)$
- CDF: $(1 + \kappa \nu) (2 \kappa)^\nu \frac{\Gamma \big(\frac{1}{2 \kappa} + \frac{\nu}{2} \big)}{\Gamma \big(\frac{1}{2 \kappa} - \frac{\nu}{2} \big)} \frac{\alpha \beta^\nu}{\Gamma \big(\nu\big)} \int_0^x z^{\alpha \nu - 1} \exp_\kappa(-\beta z^\alpha) dz$
- Mode: $\beta^{ -1 / \alpha } \Bigg( \nu - \frac{ 1 }{ \alpha } \Bigg)^{ \frac{ 1 }{ \alpha } } \Bigg[ 1 - \kappa^2 \bigg( \nu - \frac{ 1 }{ \alpha } \bigg)^2 \Bigg]^{ - \frac{ 1 }{ 2 \alpha } }$
- Method of moments: $\beta^{-m/ \alpha} \frac{(1 + \kappa \nu) (2 \kappa)^{-m/\alpha} }{1 + \kappa \big( \nu + \frac{m}{\alpha}\big)} \frac{\Gamma \big( \nu + \frac{m}{ \alpha } \big) }{\Gamma(\nu)} \frac{\Gamma\Big(\frac{1}{2\kappa} + \frac{\nu}{2}\Big)}{\Gamma\Big(\frac{1}{2\kappa} - \frac{\nu}{2}\Big)} \frac{\Gamma\Big(\frac{1}{2\kappa} - \frac{\nu}{2} - \frac{m}{2\alpha}\Big)}{\Gamma\Big(\frac{1}{2\kappa} + \frac{\nu}{2} + \frac{m}{2\alpha}\Big)}$

The Kaniadakis Generalized Gamma distribution (or κ-Generalized Gamma distribution) is a four-parameter family of continuous statistical distributions, supported on a semi-infinite interval [0,∞), which arising from the Kaniadakis statistics. It is one example of a Kaniadakis distribution. The κ-Gamma is a deformation of the Generalized Gamma distribution.

== Definitions ==
=== Probability density function ===
The Kaniadakis κ-Gamma distribution has the following probability density function:

$$f_{_{\kappa}}(x) =
(1 + \kappa \nu) (2 \kappa)^\nu \frac{\Gamma \big(\frac{1}{2 \kappa} + \frac{\nu}{2} \big)}{\Gamma \big(\frac{1}{2 \kappa} - \frac{\nu}{2} \big)} \frac{\alpha \beta^\nu}{\Gamma \big(\nu\big)} x^{\alpha \nu - 1} \exp_\kappa(-\beta x^\alpha)$$

valid for $x \geq 0$, where $0 \leq |\kappa| < 1$ is the entropic index associated with the Kaniadakis entropy, $0 < \nu < 1/\kappa$, $\beta > 0$ is the scale parameter, and $\alpha > 0$ is the shape parameter.

The ordinary generalized Gamma distribution is recovered as $\kappa \rightarrow 0$: $f_{_{0}}(x) = \frac{|\alpha| \beta ^\nu }{\Gamma \left( \nu \right)} x^{\alpha \nu - 1} \exp_\kappa(-\beta x^\alpha)$.

=== Cumulative distribution function ===
The cumulative distribution function of κ-Gamma distribution assumes the form:

$$F_\kappa(x) = (1 + \kappa \nu) (2 \kappa)^\nu \frac{\Gamma \big(\frac{1}{2 \kappa} + \frac{\nu}{2} \big)}{\Gamma \big(\frac{1}{2 \kappa} - \frac{\nu}{2} \big)} \frac{\alpha \beta^\nu}{\Gamma \big(\nu\big)} \int_0^x z^{\alpha \nu - 1} \exp_\kappa(-\beta z^\alpha) dz$$

valid for $x \geq 0$, where $0 \leq |\kappa| < 1$. The cumulative Generalized Gamma distribution is recovered in the classical limit $\kappa \rightarrow 0$.

== Properties ==
=== Moments and mode ===
The κ-Gamma distribution has moment of order $m$ given by

$$\operatorname{E}[X^m] = \beta^{-m/ \alpha} \frac{(1 + \kappa \nu) (2 \kappa)^{-m/\alpha}}{1 + \kappa \big( \nu + \frac{m}{\alpha}\big)} \frac{\Gamma \big( \nu + \frac{m}{ \alpha } \big)  }{\Gamma(\nu)} \frac{\Gamma\Big(\frac{1}{2\kappa} + \frac{\nu}{2}\Big)}{\Gamma\Big(\frac{1}{2\kappa} - \frac{\nu}{2}\Big)}  \frac{\Gamma\Big(\frac{1}{2\kappa} - \frac{\nu}{2} - \frac{m}{2\alpha}\Big)}{\Gamma\Big(\frac{1}{2\kappa} + \frac{\nu}{2} + \frac{m}{2\alpha}\Big)}$$

The moment of order $m$ of the κ-Gamma distribution is finite for $0 < \nu + m/\alpha < 1/\kappa$.

The mode is given by:

$$x_{\textrm{mode}} = \beta^{-1/\alpha} \Bigg( \nu - \frac{1}{\alpha} \Bigg)^{\frac{1}{\alpha}} \Bigg[ 1 - \kappa^2 \bigg( \nu - \frac{1}{\alpha}\bigg)^2\Bigg]^{-\frac{1}{2\alpha}}$$

=== Asymptotic behavior ===
The κ-Gamma distribution behaves asymptotically as follows:

$$\lim_{x \to +\infty} f_\kappa (x) \sim (2\kappa \beta)^{-1/\kappa} (1 + \kappa \nu) (2 \kappa)^\nu \frac{\Gamma \big(\frac{1}{2 \kappa} + \frac{\nu}{2} \big)}{\Gamma \big(\frac{1}{2 \kappa} - \frac{\nu}{2} \big)} \frac{\alpha \beta^\nu}{\Gamma \big(\nu\big)}  x^{\alpha \nu - 1 - \alpha /\kappa}$$
$$\lim_{x \to 0^+} f_\kappa (x) = (1 + \kappa \nu) (2 \kappa)^\nu \frac{\Gamma \big(\frac{1}{2 \kappa} + \frac{\nu}{2} \big)}{\Gamma \big(\frac{1}{2 \kappa} - \frac{\nu}{2} \big)} \frac{\alpha \beta^\nu}{\Gamma \big(\nu\big)}  x^{\alpha \nu - 1}$$

== Related distributions ==
- The κ-Gamma distributions is a generalization of:
  - κ-Exponential distribution of type I, when $\alpha = \nu = 1$;
  - Kaniadakis κ-Erlang distribution, when $\alpha = 1$ and $\nu = n =$ positive integer.
  - κ-Half-Normal distribution, when $\alpha = 2$ and $\nu = 1/2$;
- A κ-Gamma distribution corresponds to several probability distributions when $\kappa = 0$, such as:
  - Gamma distribution, when $\alpha = 1$;
  - Exponential distribution, when $\alpha = \nu = 1$;
  - Erlang distribution, when $\alpha = 1$ and $\nu = n =$ positive integer;
  - Chi-Squared distribution, when $\alpha = 1$ and $\nu =$ half integer;
  - Nakagami distribution, when $\alpha = 2$ and $\nu > 0$;
  - Rayleigh distribution, when $\alpha = 2$ and $\nu = 1$;
  - Chi distribution, when $\alpha = 2$ and $\nu =$ half integer;
  - Maxwell distribution, when $\alpha = 2$ and $\nu = 3/2$;
  - Half-Normal distribution, when $\alpha = 2$ and $\nu = 1/2$;
  - Weibull distribution, when $\alpha > 0$ and $\nu = 1$;
  - Stretched Exponential distribution, when $\alpha > 0$ and $\nu = 1/\alpha$;

== See also ==
- Giorgio Kaniadakis
- Kaniadakis statistics
- Kaniadakis distribution
- Kaniadakis κ-Exponential distribution
- Kaniadakis κ-Gaussian distribution
- Kaniadakis κ-Weibull distribution
- Kaniadakis κ-Logistic distribution
- Kaniadakis κ-Erlang distribution
