= Kaniadakis Weibull distribution =

Continuous probability distribution

κ-Weibull distribution
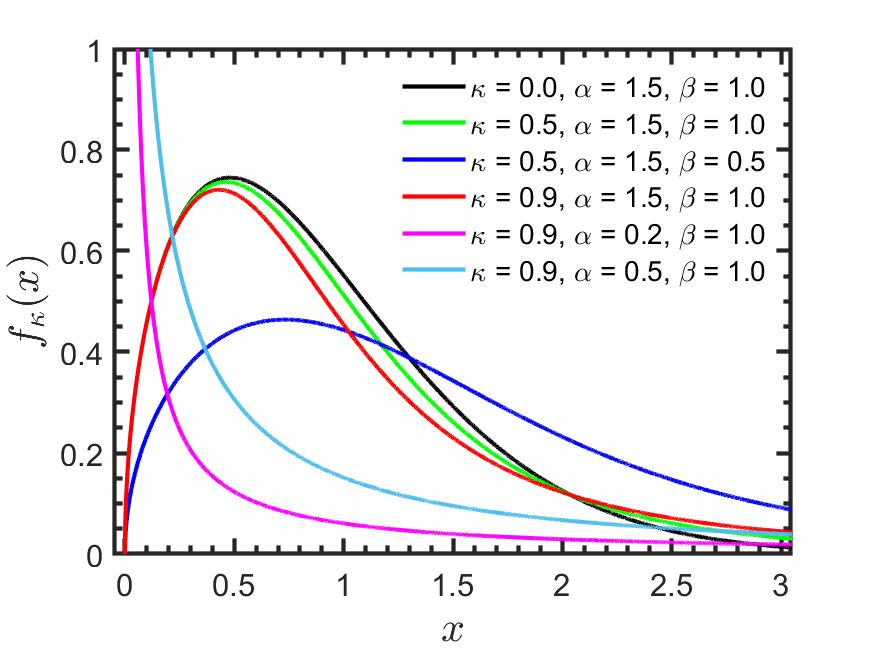
- Probability density function

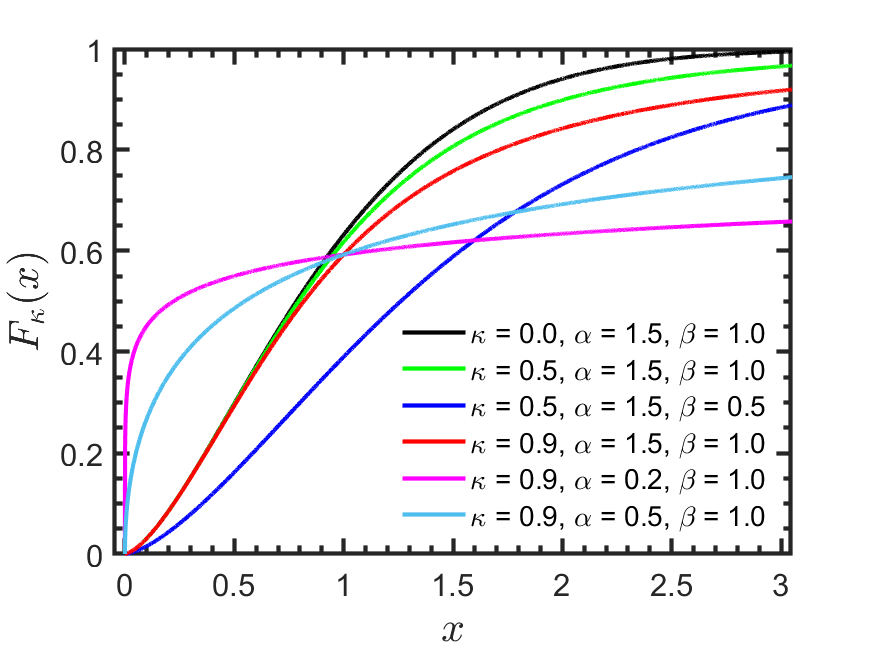
- Cumulative distribution function
- Parameters: $0 < \kappa < 1$ $\alpha > 0$ rate shape (real) $\beta> 0$ rate (real)
- Support: $x \in [0, +\infty)$
- PDF: $\frac{ \alpha \beta x^{ \alpha - 1 } } { \sqrt{ 1 + \kappa^2 \beta^2 x^{2 \alpha} } } \exp_\kappa ( - \beta x^\alpha )$
- CDF: $1 - \exp_\kappa(-\beta x^\alpha)$
- Quantile: $\beta^{-1 / \alpha } \Bigg[ \ln_\kappa \Bigg(\frac{1}{1 - F_\kappa} \Bigg) \Bigg]^{1/ \alpha}$
- Median: $\beta^{-1/\alpha} \Bigg(\ln_\kappa (2)\Bigg)^{1/\alpha}$
- Mode: $\beta^{ -1 / \alpha } \Bigg( \frac{ \alpha^2 + 2 \kappa^2 (\alpha - 1 )}{ 2 \kappa^2 ( \alpha^2 - \kappa^2)} \sqrt{1 + \frac{4 \kappa^2 (\alpha^2 - \kappa^2 )( \alpha - 1)^2}{ [ \alpha^2 + 2 \kappa^2 (\alpha - 1) ]^2} } - 1 \Bigg)^{1/2 \alpha}$
- Method of moments: $\frac{ (2 \kappa \beta )^{-m/ \alpha } }{ 1 + \kappa \frac{ m }{ \alpha } } \frac{ \Gamma \Big( \frac{ 1 }{ 2 \kappa }-\frac{m}{2 \alpha }\Big)}{ \Gamma \Big(\frac{1}{2 \kappa }+\frac{m}{2 \alpha } \Big) } \Gamma \Big(1+\frac{m}{ \alpha } \Big)$

The Kaniadakis Weibull distribution (or κ-Weibull distribution) is a probability distribution arising as a generalization of the Weibull distribution. It is one example of a Kaniadakis κ-distribution. The κ-Weibull distribution has been adopted successfully for describing a wide variety of complex systems in seismology, economy, epidemiology, among many others.

== Definitions ==
=== Probability density function ===
The Kaniadakis κ-Weibull distribution is exhibits power-law right tails, and it has the following probability density function:

$$f_{_{\kappa}}(x) =
\frac{\alpha \beta x^{\alpha-1}}{\sqrt{1+\kappa^2 \beta^2 x^{2\alpha} }} \exp_\kappa(-\beta x^\alpha)$$

valid for $x \geq 0$, where $|\kappa| < 1$ is the entropic index associated with the Kaniadakis entropy, $\beta > 0$ is the scale parameter, and $\alpha > 0$ is the shape parameter or Weibull modulus.

The Weibull distribution is recovered as $\kappa \rightarrow 0.$

=== Cumulative distribution function ===
The cumulative distribution function of κ-Weibull distribution is given by

$F_\kappa(x) = 1 - \exp_\kappa(-\beta x^\alpha)$

valid for $x \geq 0$. The cumulative Weibull distribution is recovered in the classical limit $\kappa \rightarrow 0$.

=== Survival distribution and hazard functions ===
The survival distribution function of κ-Weibull distribution is given by

$$S_\kappa(x) = \exp_\kappa(-\beta x^\alpha)$$

valid for $x \geq 0$. The survival Weibull distribution is recovered in the classical limit $\kappa \rightarrow 0$.

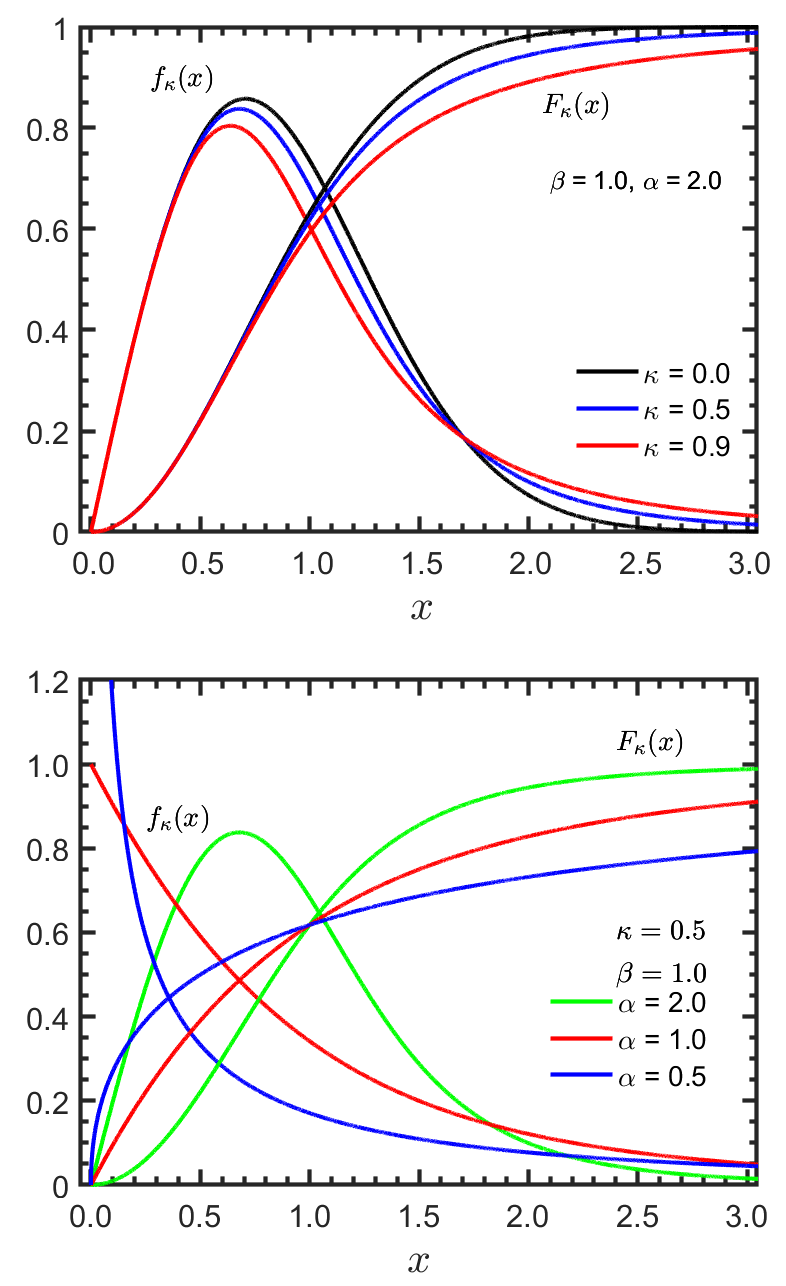
Comparison between the Kaniadakis κ-Weibull probability function and its cumulative.

The hazard function of the κ-Weibull distribution is obtained through the solution of the κ-rate equation:

$\frac{ S_\kappa(x) }{ dx } = -h_\kappa S_\kappa(x)$

with $S_\kappa(0) = 1$, where $h_\kappa$ is the hazard function:

$$h_\kappa = \frac{\alpha \beta x^{\alpha-1}}{\sqrt{1+\kappa^2 \beta^2 x^{2\alpha} }}$$

The cumulative κ-Weibull distribution is related to the κ-hazard function by the following expression:

$$S_\kappa = e^{-H_\kappa(x)}$$

where

$$H_\kappa (x) = \int_0^x h_\kappa(z) dz$$
$$H_\kappa (x) = \frac{1}{\kappa} \textrm{arcsinh}\left(\kappa \beta x^\alpha \right)$$

is the cumulative κ-hazard function. The cumulative hazard function of the Weibull distribution is recovered in the classical limit $\kappa \rightarrow 0$: $H(x) = \beta x^\alpha$ .

== Properties ==
=== Moments, median and mode ===
The κ-Weibull distribution has moment of order $m \in \mathbb{N}$ given by

$$\operatorname{E}[X^m] = \frac{|2\kappa \beta|^{-m/\alpha}}{1+\kappa \frac{m}{\alpha}} \frac{\Gamma\Big(\frac{1}{2\kappa}-\frac{m}{2\alpha}\Big)}{\Gamma\Big(\frac{1}{2\kappa}+\frac{m}{2\alpha}\Big)} \Gamma\Big(1+\frac{m}{\alpha}\Big)$$

The median and the mode are:

$$x_{\textrm{median}} (F_\kappa) = \beta^{-1/\alpha} \Bigg(\ln_\kappa (2)\Bigg)^{1/\alpha}$$

$$x_{\textrm{mode}} = \beta^{ -1 / \alpha } \Bigg( \frac{ \alpha^2 + 2 \kappa^2 (\alpha - 1 )}{ 2 \kappa^2 ( \alpha^2 - \kappa^2)}\Bigg)^{1/2 \alpha} \Bigg( \sqrt{1 + \frac{4 \kappa^2 (\alpha^2 - \kappa^2 )( \alpha - 1)^2}{ [ \alpha^2 + 2 \kappa^2 (\alpha - 1) ]^2} } - 1 \Bigg)^{1/2 \alpha} \quad (\alpha > 1)$$

==== Quantiles ====
The quantiles are given by the following expression

$x_{\textrm{quantile}} (F_\kappa) = \beta^{-1 / \alpha } \Bigg[ \ln_\kappa \Bigg(\frac{1}{1 - F_\kappa} \Bigg) \Bigg]^{1/ \alpha}$

with $0 \leq F_\kappa \leq 1$.

==== Gini coefficient ====
The Gini coefficient is:

$\operatorname{G}_\kappa = 1 - \frac{\alpha + \kappa}{ \alpha + \frac{1}{2}\kappa } \frac{\Gamma\Big( \frac{1}{\kappa} - \frac{1}{2 \alpha}\Big)}{\Gamma\Big( \frac{1}{\kappa} + \frac{1}{2 \alpha}\Big)} \frac{\Gamma\Big( \frac{1}{2 \kappa} + \frac{1}{2 \alpha}\Big)}{\Gamma\Big( \frac{1}{ 2\kappa} - \frac{1}{2 \alpha}\Big)}$

==== Asymptotic behavior ====
The κ-Weibull distribution II behaves asymptotically as follows:

$$\lim_{x \to +\infty} f_\kappa (x) \sim \frac{\alpha}{\kappa} (2 \kappa \beta)^{-1/\kappa} x^{-1 - \alpha/\kappa}$$
$$\lim_{x \to 0^+} f_\kappa (x) = \alpha \beta x^{\alpha - 1}$$

== Related distributions ==
- The κ-Weibull distribution is a generalization of:
  - κ-Exponential distribution of type II, when $\alpha = 1$;
  - Exponential distribution when $\kappa = 0$ and $\alpha = 1$.
- A κ-Weibull distribution corresponds to a κ-deformed Rayleigh distribution when $\alpha = 2$ and a Rayleigh distribution when $\kappa = 0$ and $\alpha = 2$.

== Applications ==
The κ-Weibull distribution has been applied in several areas, such as:

- In economy, for analyzing personal income models, in order to accurately describing simultaneously the income distribution among the richest part and the great majority of the population.
- In seismology, the κ-Weibull represents the statistical distribution of magnitude of the earthquakes distributed across the Earth, generalizing the Gutenberg–Richter law, and the interval distributions of seismic data, modeling extreme-event return intervals.
- In epidemiology, the κ-Weibull distribution presents a universal feature for epidemiological analysis.

== See also ==
- Giorgio Kaniadakis
- Kaniadakis statistics
- Kaniadakis distribution
- Kaniadakis κ-Exponential distribution
- Kaniadakis κ-Gaussian distribution
- Kaniadakis κ-Gamma distribution
- Kaniadakis κ-Logistic distribution
- Kaniadakis κ-Erlang distribution
