= Kaniadakis statistics =

Statistical physics approach

Kaniadakis statistics (also known as κ-statistics) is a generalization of Boltzmann–Gibbs statistical mechanics, based on a relativistic generalization of the classical Boltzmann–Gibbs–Shannon entropy (commonly referred to as Kaniadakis entropy or κ-entropy). Introduced by the Greek Italian physicist Giorgio Kaniadakis in 2001, κ-statistical mechanics preserve the main features of ordinary statistical mechanics and have attracted the interest of many researchers in recent years. The κ-distribution is currently considered one of the most viable candidates for explaining complex physical, natural or artificial systems involving power-law tailed statistical distributions. Kaniadakis statistics have been adopted successfully in the description of a variety of systems in the fields of cosmology, astrophysics, condensed matter, quantum physics, seismology, genomics, economics, epidemiology, and many others.

== Mathematical formalism ==
The mathematical formalism of κ-statistics is generated by κ-deformed functions, especially the κ-exponential function.

=== κ-exponential function ===
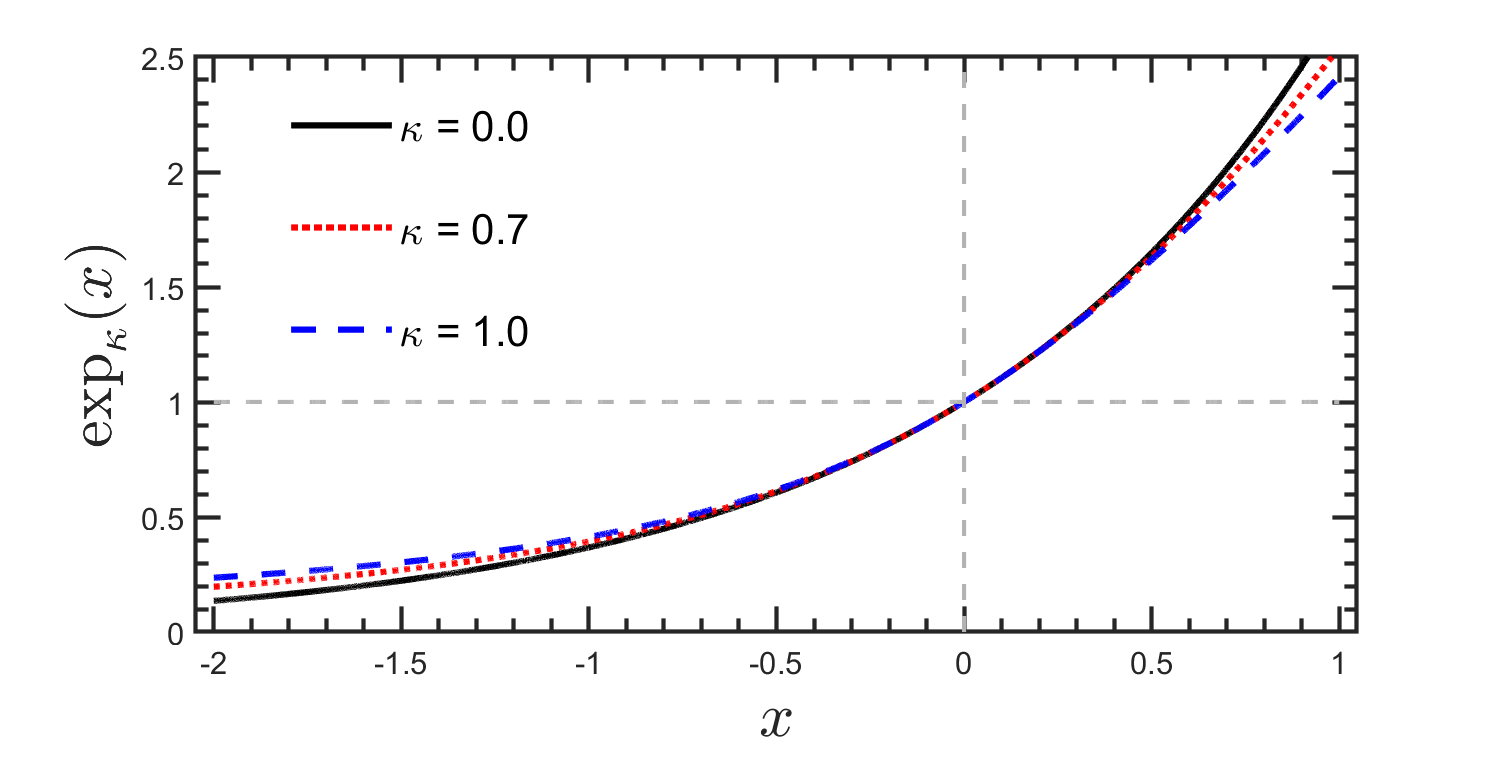
Plot of the κ-exponential function $\exp_\kappa(x)$ for three different κ-values. The solid black curve corresponding to the ordinary exponential function $\exp(x)$ ($\kappa = 0$).

The Kaniadakis exponential (or κ-exponential) function is a one-parameter generalization of an exponential function, given by:

$$\exp_\kappa (x) = \begin{cases}
\Big(\sqrt{1+\kappa^2 x^2}+\kappa x \Big)^\frac{1}{\kappa} & \text{if } 0 < \kappa < 1. \\[6pt]
\exp(x) & \text{if }\kappa = 0, \\[8pt]
\end{cases}$$
with $\exp_{-\kappa} (x) = \exp_\kappa (x)$.

The κ-exponential for $0 < \kappa < 1$ can also be written in the form:

$$\exp_\kappa (x) = \exp\Bigg(\frac{1}{\kappa} \text{arsinh} (\kappa x)\Bigg).$$
The first five terms of the Taylor expansion of $\exp_\kappa(x)$ are given by:
$$\exp_\kappa (x) = 1 + x + \frac{x^2}{2} + (1 - \kappa^2) \frac{x^3}{3!} + (1 - 4 \kappa^2) \frac{x^4}{4!} + \cdots$$
where the first three are the same as a typical exponential function.

Basic properties

The κ-exponential function has the following properties of an exponential function:
$$\exp_\kappa (x) \in \mathbb{C}^\infty(\mathbb{R})$$
$$\frac{d}{dx}\exp_\kappa (x) > 0$$
$$\frac{d^2}{dx^2}\exp_\kappa (x) > 0$$
$$\exp_\kappa (-\infty) = 0^+$$
$$\exp_\kappa (0) = 1$$
$$\exp_\kappa (+\infty) = +\infty$$
$$\exp_\kappa (x) \exp_\kappa (-x) = -1$$
For a real number $r$, the κ-exponential has the property:
$$\Big[\exp_\kappa (x)\Big]^r = \exp_{\kappa/r} (rx).$$

=== κ-logarithm function ===
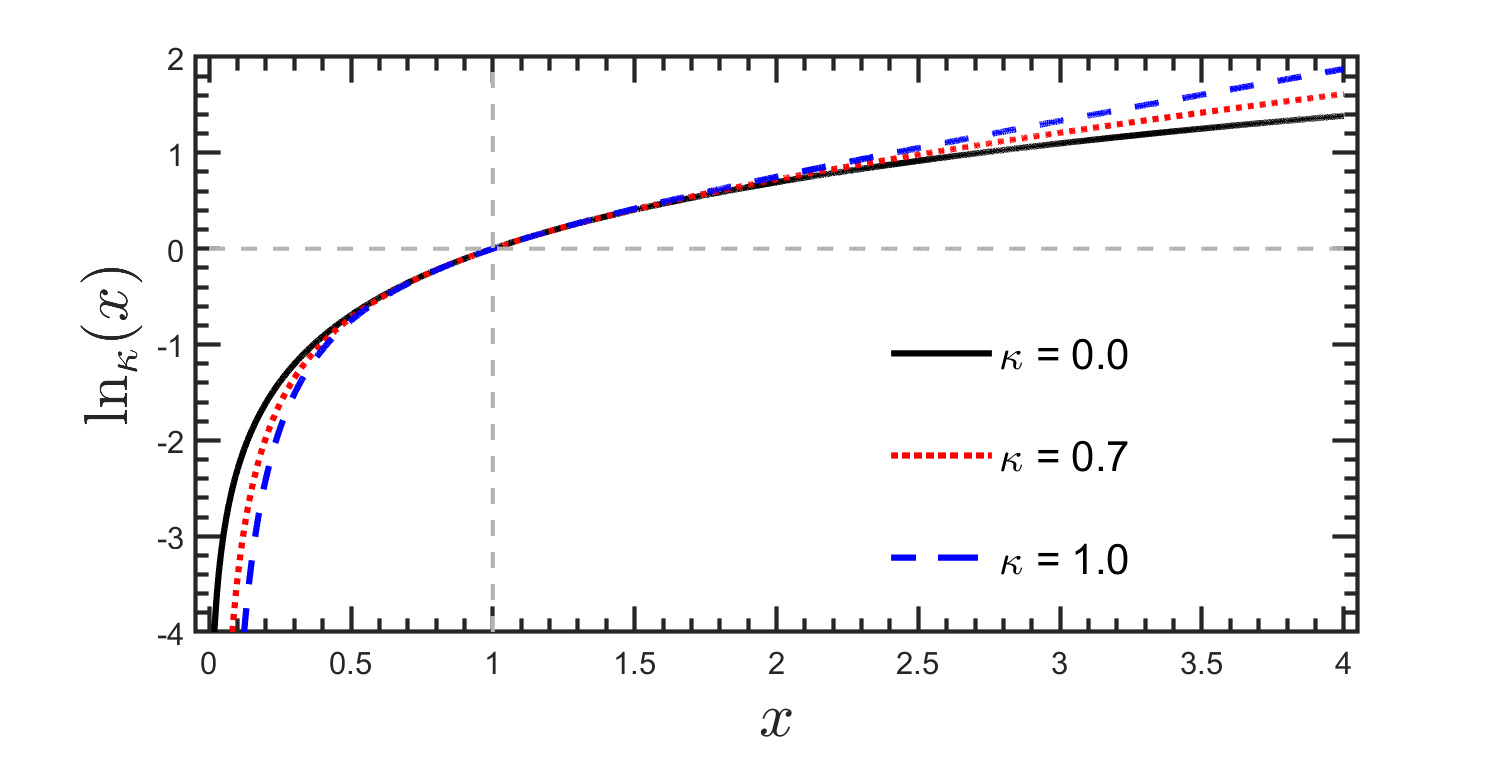
Plot of the κ-logarithmic function $\ln_\kappa(x)$ for three different κ-values. The solid black curve corresponding to the ordinary logarithmic function $\ln(x)$ ($\kappa = 0$).

The Kaniadakis logarithm (or κ-logarithm) is a relativistic one-parameter generalization of the ordinary logarithm function,
$$\ln_\kappa (x) = \begin{cases}
\frac{x^\kappa - x^{-\kappa}}{2\kappa} & \text{if } 0 < \kappa < 1, \\[8pt]
\ln(x) & \text{if }\kappa = 0, \\[8pt]
\end{cases}$$
with $\ln_{-\kappa} (x) = \ln_\kappa (x)$, which is the inverse function of the κ-exponential:

$$\ln_\kappa\left( \exp_\kappa(x)\right) = \exp_\kappa\left( \ln_\kappa(x)\right) = x.$$
The κ-logarithm for $0 < \kappa < 1$ can also be written in the form:

$\ln_\kappa(x) = \frac{1}{\kappa}\sinh\Big(\kappa \ln(x)\Big)$

The first three terms of the Taylor expansion of $\ln_\kappa(x)$ are given by:

$$\ln_\kappa (1+x) = x - \frac{x^2}{2} + \left( 1 + \frac{\kappa^2}{2}\right) \frac{x^3}{3} - \cdots$$

following the rule

$$\ln_\kappa(1+x) = \sum_{n=1}^{\infty} b_n(\kappa)\,(-1)^{n-1} \,\frac{x^n}{n}$$

with $b_1(\kappa)= 1$, and

$$b_{n}(\kappa) (x) = \begin{cases}
1 & \text{if } n = 1, \\[8pt]
\frac{1}{2}\Big(1-\kappa\Big)\Big(1-\frac{\kappa}{2}\Big)...
\Big(1-\frac{\kappa}{n-1}\Big) \,+\,\frac{1}{2}\Big(1+\kappa\Big)\Big(1+\frac{\kappa}{2}\Big) \dots
\Big(1+\frac{\kappa}{n-1}\Big) & \text{for } n > 1, \\[8pt]
\end{cases}$$

where $b_n(0)=1$ and $b_n(-\kappa)=b_n(\kappa)$. The two first terms of the Taylor expansion of $\ln_\kappa(x)$ are the same as an ordinary logarithmic function.

Basic properties

The κ-logarithm function has the following properties of a logarithmic function:
$$\ln_\kappa (x) \in \mathbb{C}^\infty(\mathbb{R}^+)$$
$$\frac{d}{dx}\ln_\kappa (x) > 0$$
$$\frac{d^2}{dx^2}\ln_\kappa (x) < 0$$
$$\ln_\kappa (0^+) = -\infty$$
$$\ln_\kappa (1) = 0$$
$$\ln_\kappa (+\infty) = +\infty$$
$$\ln_\kappa (1/x) = -\ln_\kappa (x)$$
For a real number $r$, the κ-logarithm has the property:
$$\ln_\kappa (x^r) = r \ln_{r \kappa} (x)$$

=== κ-Algebra ===
==== κ-sum ====
For any $x,y \in \mathbb{R}$ and $|\kappa| < 1$, the Kaniadakis sum (or κ-sum) is defined by the following composition law:
$$x\mathop\oplus^\kappa y = x\sqrt{1+\kappa^2y^2}+y\sqrt{1+\kappa^2x^2} ,$$
that can also be written in form:
$$x\mathop\oplus^\kappa y = {1\over\kappa}\,\sinh \left(\operatorname{arsinh}(\kappa x)\,+\,\operatorname{arsinh}(\kappa y)\right),$$
where the ordinary sum is a particular case in the classical limit $\kappa \to 0$: $x \mathop\oplus^0 y = x + y$.

The κ-sum, like the ordinary sum, has the following properties:

1. associativity:
  $$(x\mathop\oplus^\kappa y)\mathop\oplus^\kappa z = x \mathop\oplus^\kappa (y \mathop\oplus^\kappa z)$$
2. neutral element:
  $$x \mathop\oplus^\kappa 0 = 0 \mathop\oplus^\kappa x = x$$
3. opposite element:
  $$x\mathop\oplus^\kappa(-x)=(-x) \mathop\oplus^\kappa x=0$$
4. commutativity:
  $$x\mathop\oplus^\kappa y=y\mathop\oplus^\kappa x$$

The κ-difference $\mathop\ominus^\kappa$ is given by $x\mathop\ominus^\kappa y = x \mathop\oplus^\kappa(-y)$.

The fundamental property $\exp_\kappa(-x)\exp_\kappa(x)=1$ arises as a special case of the more general expression below: $\exp_\kappa(x)\exp_\kappa(y)=exp_\kappa(x\mathop\oplus^\kappa y)$

Furthermore, the κ-functions and the κ-sum present the following relationships:
$$\ln_\kappa(x\,y) = \ln_\kappa(x) \mathop\oplus^\kappa\ln_\kappa(y)$$

==== κ-product ====
For any $x,y \in \mathbb{R}$ and $|\kappa| < 1$, the Kaniadakis product (or κ-product) is defined by the following composition law:
$$x \mathop\otimes^\kappa y = {1\over\kappa} \,\sinh \left({1\over\kappa} \,\operatorname{arsinh}(\kappa x)\,\operatorname{arsinh}(\kappa y)\right),$$
where the ordinary product is a particular case in the classical limit $\kappa \to 0$: $x \mathop\otimes^0 y = x \times y = xy$.

The κ-product, like the ordinary product, has the following properties:

1. associativity:
  $$\left(x \mathop\otimes^\kappa y\right) \mathop\otimes^\kappa z = x \mathop\otimes^\kappa \left(y \mathop\otimes^\kappa z\right)$$
2. neutral element:
  $$x \mathop\otimes^\kappa I = I \mathop\otimes^\kappa x = x \quad \text{for} \quad I = \kappa^{-1}\sinh \kappa \mathop\oplus^\kappa x=x$$
3. inverse element:
  $$x \mathop\otimes^\kappa\overline x= \overline x \mathop\otimes^\kappa x=I  \quad \text{for} \quad \overline x = \kappa^{-1}\sinh\left(\kappa^2/\operatorname{arsinh}(\kappa x)\right)$$
4. commutativity:
  $$x\mathop\otimes^\kappa y=y\mathop\otimes^\kappa x$$

The κ-division $\mathop\oslash^\kappa$ is given by $x \mathop\oslash^\kappa y = x\mathop\otimes^\kappa\overline y$.

The κ-sum $\mathop\oplus^\kappa$ and the κ-product $\mathop\otimes^\kappa$ obey the distributive law: $z \mathop\otimes^\kappa \left(x \mathop\oplus^\kappa y\right) = \left(z \mathop\otimes^\kappa x\right) \mathop\oplus^\kappa \left(z \mathop\otimes^\kappa y\right)$.

The fundamental property $\ln_\kappa(1/x)=-\ln_\kappa(x)$ arises as a special case of the more general expression below:

$$\ln_\kappa(x\,y) = \ln_\kappa(x) \mathop\oplus^\kappa \ln_\kappa(y)$$

Furthermore, the κ-functions and the κ-product present the following relationships:
$$\exp_\kappa(x) \mathop\otimes^\kappa \exp_\kappa(y) = \exp_\kappa(x\,+\,y)$$
$$\ln_\kappa(x\,\mathop\otimes^\kappa\,y) = \ln_\kappa(x) + \ln_\kappa(y)$$

=== κ-Calculus ===
==== κ-Differential ====
The Kaniadakis differential (or κ-differential) of $x$ is defined by:
$$\mathrm{d}_\kappa x = \frac{\mathrm{d}\,x}{\displaystyle{\sqrt{1+\kappa^2\,x^2} }}.$$

So, the κ-derivative of a function $f(x)$ is related to the Leibniz derivative through:
$$\frac{\mathrm{d} f(x)}{\mathrm{d}_\kappa x} = \gamma_\kappa (x) \frac{\mathrm{d} f(x)}{\mathrm{d} x} ,$$
where $\gamma_\kappa(x) = \sqrt{1+\kappa^2 x^2}$ is the Lorentz factor. The ordinary derivative $\frac{\mathrm{d} f(x)}{\mathrm{d} x}$ is a particular case of κ-derivative $\frac{\mathrm{d} f(x)}{\mathrm{d}_\kappa x}$ in the classical limit $\kappa \rightarrow 0$.

==== κ-Integral ====
The Kaniadakis integral (or κ-integral) is the inverse operator of the κ-derivative defined through
$$\int \mathrm{d}_\kappa x \,\, f(x)= \int \frac{\mathrm{d}\, x}{\sqrt{1+\kappa^2\,x^2}}\,\,f(x) ,$$
which recovers the ordinary integral in the classical limit $\kappa \to 0$.

=== κ-Trigonometry ===
==== κ-Cyclic Trigonometry ====
[click on the figure] Plot of the κ-sine and κ-cosine functions for $\kappa = 0$ (black curve) and $\kappa = 0.1$ (blue curve).

The Kaniadakis cyclic trigonometry (or κ-cyclic trigonometry) is based on the κ-cyclic sine (or κ-sine) and κ-cyclic cosine (or κ-cosine) functions defined by:
$$\sin_\kappa(x) =\frac{\exp_\kappa(ix) -\exp_\kappa(-ix)}{2i} ,$$
$$\cos_\kappa(x) =\frac{\exp_\kappa(ix) +\exp_\kappa(-ix)}{2} ,$$
where the κ-generalized Euler formula is
$$\exp_\kappa(\pm ix)=\cos_\kappa(x)\pm i\sin_\kappa(x) .$$

The κ-cyclic trigonometry preserves fundamental expressions of the ordinary cyclic trigonometry, which is a special case in the limit κ → 0, such as:
$$\cos_\kappa^2(x) + \sin_\kappa^2(x) = 1$$
$$\sin_\kappa(x \mathop\oplus^\kappa y) = \sin_\kappa(x) \cos_\kappa(y) + \cos_\kappa(x) \sin_\kappa(y) .$$

The κ-cyclic tangent and κ-cyclic cotangent functions are given by:
$$\tan_\kappa(x)=\frac{\sin_\kappa(x)}{\cos_\kappa(x)}$$
$$\cot_\kappa(x)=\frac{\cos_\kappa(x)}{\sin_\kappa(x)} .$$

The κ-cyclic trigonometric functions become the ordinary trigonometric function in the classical limit $\kappa \to 0$.

κ-Inverse cyclic function

The Kaniadakis inverse cyclic functions (or κ-inverse cyclic functions) are associated to the κ-logarithm:
$$\arcsin_\kappa(x) = -i\ln_\kappa\left(\sqrt{1-x^2}+ix\right),$$
$$\arccos_\kappa(x) = -i\ln_\kappa\left(\sqrt{x^2-1}+x\right) ,$$
$$\arctan_\kappa(x) = i \ln_\kappa\left(\sqrt{\frac{1-ix}{1+ix}}\right) ,$$
$$\arccot_\kappa(x) = i \ln_\kappa\left(\sqrt{\frac{ix+1}{ix-1}}\right) .$$

==== κ-Hyperbolic Trigonometry ====
The Kaniadakis hyperbolic trigonometry (or κ-hyperbolic trigonometry) is based on the κ-hyperbolic sine and κ-hyperbolic cosine given by:
$$\sinh_\kappa(x) =\frac{\exp_\kappa(x) -\exp_\kappa(-x)}{2} ,$$
$$\cosh_\kappa(x) =\frac{\exp_\kappa(x) +\exp_\kappa(-x)}{2} ,$$
where the κ-Euler formula is
$$\exp_\kappa(\pm x)=\cosh_\kappa(x)\pm \sinh_\kappa(x) .$$

The κ-hyperbolic tangent and κ-hyperbolic cotangent functions are given by:
$$\tanh_\kappa(x)=\frac{\sinh_\kappa(x)}{\cosh_\kappa(x)}$$
$$\coth_\kappa(x)=\frac{\cosh_\kappa(x)}{\sinh_\kappa(x)}.$$

The κ-hyperbolic trigonometric functions become the ordinary hyperbolic trigonometric functions in the classical limit $\kappa \to 0$.

From the κ-Euler formula and the property $\exp_\kappa(-x)\exp_\kappa(x)=1$ the fundamental expression of κ-hyperbolic trigonometry is given as follows:
$$\cosh_\kappa^2(x)- \sinh_\kappa^2(x)=1$$

κ-Inverse hyperbolic function

The Kaniadakis inverse hyperbolic functions (or κ-inverse hyperbolic functions) are associated to the κ-logarithm:
$$\operatorname{arsinh}_\kappa(x)=\ln_\kappa\left(\sqrt{1+x^2}+x\right),$$
$$\operatorname{arcosh}_\kappa(x)=\ln_\kappa\left(\sqrt{x^2-1}+x\right),$$
$$\operatorname{artanh}_\kappa(x)=\ln_\kappa\left(\sqrt{\frac{1+x}{1-x}}\right),$$
$$\operatorname{arcoth}_\kappa(x)=\ln_\kappa\left(\sqrt{\frac{1-x}{1+x}}\right),$$
in which are valid the following relations:
$$\operatorname{arsinh}_\kappa(x) = \operatorname{sign}(x)\operatorname{arcosh}_\kappa\left(\sqrt{1+x^2}\right),$$
$$\operatorname{arsinh}_\kappa(x) = \operatorname{artanh}_\kappa\left(\frac{x}{\sqrt{1+x^2}}\right) ,$$
$$\operatorname{arsinh}_\kappa(x) = \operatorname{arcoth}_\kappa\left(\frac{\sqrt{1+x^2}}{x}\right) .$$
The κ-cyclic and κ-hyperbolic trigonometric functions are connected by the following relationships:
$${\sin}_\kappa(x) = -i\operatorname{sinh}_\kappa(ix),$$
$${\cos}_\kappa(x) = \operatorname{cosh}_\kappa(ix),$$
$${\tan}_\kappa(x) = -i\operatorname{tanh}_\kappa(ix),$$
$${\cot}_\kappa(x) = i\operatorname{coth}_\kappa(ix),$$
$${\arcsin}_\kappa(x)=-i\,\operatorname{arsinh}_\kappa(ix),$$
$${\arccos}_\kappa(x)\neq -i\,\operatorname{arcosh}_\kappa(ix),$$
$${\arctan}_\kappa(x)=-i\,\operatorname{artanh}_\kappa(ix),$$
$${\arccot}_\kappa(x)=i\,\operatorname{arcoth}_\kappa(ix).$$

=== Kaniadakis entropy ===
The Kaniadakis statistics is based on the Kaniadakis κ-entropy, which is defined through:
$$S_\kappa{\left(p\right)} = -\sum_i p_i \ln_\kappa\left(p_i\right) = \sum_i p_i \ln_\kappa \left(\frac{1}{p_i} \right)$$
where $p = \left\{p_i = p(x_i); x \in \mathbb{R}; i = 1, 2, \dots, N; \sum_i p_i = 1\right\}$ is a probability distribution function defined for a random variable $X$, and $0 \leq |\kappa| < 1$ is the entropic index.

The Kaniadakis κ-entropy is thermodynamically and Lesche stable and obeys the Shannon-Khinchin axioms of continuity, maximality, generalized additivity and expandability.

== Kaniadakis distributions ==
A Kaniadakis distribution (or κ-distribution) is a probability distribution derived from the maximization of Kaniadakis entropy under appropriate constraints. In this regard, several probability distributions emerge for analyzing a wide variety of phenomenology associated with experimental power-law tailed statistical distributions.

== Kaniadakis integral transform ==
=== κ-Laplace Transform ===
The Kaniadakis Laplace transform (or κ-Laplace transform) is a κ-deformed integral transform of the ordinary Laplace transform. The κ-Laplace transform converts a function $f$ of a real variable $t$ to a new function $F_\kappa(s)$ in the complex frequency domain, represented by the complex variable $s$. This κ-integral transform is defined as:
$$F_\kappa(s) = \mathcal{L}_\kappa\{f(t)\}(s)=\int_0^\infty \!f(t) \,[\exp_\kappa(-t)]^s\,dt$$
The inverse κ-Laplace transform is given by:
$$f(t) = \mathcal{L}^{-1}_\kappa\{F_\kappa(s)\}(t) = \frac{1}{2\pi i} \int_{c-i \infty}^{c+i \infty}\!F_\kappa(s) \,\frac{[\exp_\kappa(t)]^s}{\sqrt{1+\kappa^2t^2}}\,ds$$
The ordinary Laplace transform and its inverse transform are recovered as $\kappa \to 0$.

Properties

Let two functions $f(t) = {\cal L}^{-1}_\kappa\{F_\kappa(s)\}(t)$ and $g(t) = {\cal L}^{-1}_\kappa\{G_\kappa(s)\}(t)$, and their respective κ-Laplace transforms $F_\kappa(s)$ and $G_\kappa(s)$, the following table presents the main properties of κ-Laplace transform:

Properties of the κ-Laplace transform
| Property | $f(t)$ | $F_\kappa(s)$ |
|---|---|---|
| Linearity | $a\, f (t)+ b\, g (t)$ | $a\, F_\kappa (s)+ b\, G_\kappa (s)$ |
| Time scaling | $f(at)$ | $\frac{1}{a}\, F_{\kappa / a} (\frac{s}{a})$ |
| Frequency shifting | $f(t)\, [\exp_\kappa(-t)]^{a}$ | $F_\kappa(s-a)$ |
| Derivative | $\frac{d\, f(t)}{dt}$ | $s\, {\cal L}_\kappa\left \{\frac{f(t)}{\sqrt{1+\kappa^2 t^2}}\right \}(s)-f(0)$ |
| Derivative | $\frac{d}{dt} \, \sqrt{1+\kappa^2 t^2} \, f(t)$ | $s \, F_\kappa (s) -f(0)$ |
| Time-domain integration | $\frac{1}{\sqrt{1+\kappa^2 t^2}}\, \int_0^t f(w)dw$ | $\frac{1}{s} \, F_\kappa (s)$ |
| | $f(t)\, [\ln (\exp_\kappa(t))]^n$ | $(-1)^n \frac{d^{n} F_\kappa(s)}{ds^n}$ |
| | $f(t) \,[\ln (\exp_\kappa(t))]^{-n}$ | $\int_s^{+\infty}dw_{n} \int_{w_n}^{+\infty}dw_{n-1}...\int_{w_3}^{+\infty}dw_{2}\int_{w_2}^{+\infty}dw_{1} \,F_\kappa(w_1)$ |
| Dirac delta-function | $\delta (t-\tau)$ | $[\exp_\kappa(-\tau)]^s$ |
| Heaviside unit function | $u(t-\tau)$ | $\frac{s\sqrt{1+\kappa^2 \tau^2}+\kappa^2 \tau}{s^2-\kappa^2}\, [\exp_\kappa(-\tau)]^{s}$ |
| Power function | $t^{\nu-1}$ | $\frac{s^2}{s^2-\kappa^2\nu^2}\,\frac{\Gamma_{\frac{\kappa}{s}}(\nu+1)}{\nu\, s^{\nu}}=\frac{s}{s+|\kappa|\nu}\, \frac{\Gamma (\nu)}{|2\kappa|^{\nu}}\, \frac{\Gamma\left( \frac{s}{|2\kappa|} - \frac{\nu}{2} \right )} {\Gamma\left( \frac{s}{|2\kappa|} + \frac{\nu}{2} \right )}$ |
| Power function | $t^{2m-1}, \ \ m \in Z^+$ | $\frac{(2m-1)!}{\prod_{j=1}^{m}\left[s^2-(2j)^2\kappa^2\right] }$ |
| Power function | $t^{2m}, \ \ m \in Z^+$ | $\frac{(2m)!\, s}{\prod_{j=1}^{m+1}\left[s^2-(2j-1)^2\kappa^2\right] }$ |

The κ-Laplace transforms presented in the latter table reduce to the corresponding ordinary Laplace transforms in the classical limit $\kappa \to 0$.

=== κ-Fourier Transform ===
The Kaniadakis Fourier transform (or κ-Fourier transform) is a κ-deformed integral transform of the ordinary Fourier transform, which is consistent with the κ-algebra and the κ-calculus. The κ-Fourier transform is defined as:

$${\cal F}_\kappa[f(x)](\omega) = {1\over\sqrt{2\,\pi}} \int_{-\infty}^{+\infty}f(x)\,
\exp_\kappa(-x\otimes_\kappa\omega)^i\,d_\kappa x$$

which can be rewritten as

$${\cal F}_\kappa[f(x)](\omega)={1\over\sqrt{2\,\pi}}\int\limits_{-\infty}\limits^{+\infty}f(x)\,
{\exp(-i\,x_{\{\kappa\}}\,\omega_{\{\kappa\}})\over\sqrt{1+\kappa^2\,x^2}} \,d x$$

where $x_{\{\kappa\}}=\frac{1}{\kappa}\, \operatorname{arsinh} \,(\kappa\,x)$ and $\omega_{\{\kappa\}}=\frac{1}{\kappa}\, \operatorname{arsinh} \,(\kappa\,\omega)$. The κ-Fourier transform imposes an asymptotically log-periodic behavior by deforming the parameters $x$ and $\omega$ in addition to a damping factor, namely $\sqrt{1+\kappa^2\,x^2}$.

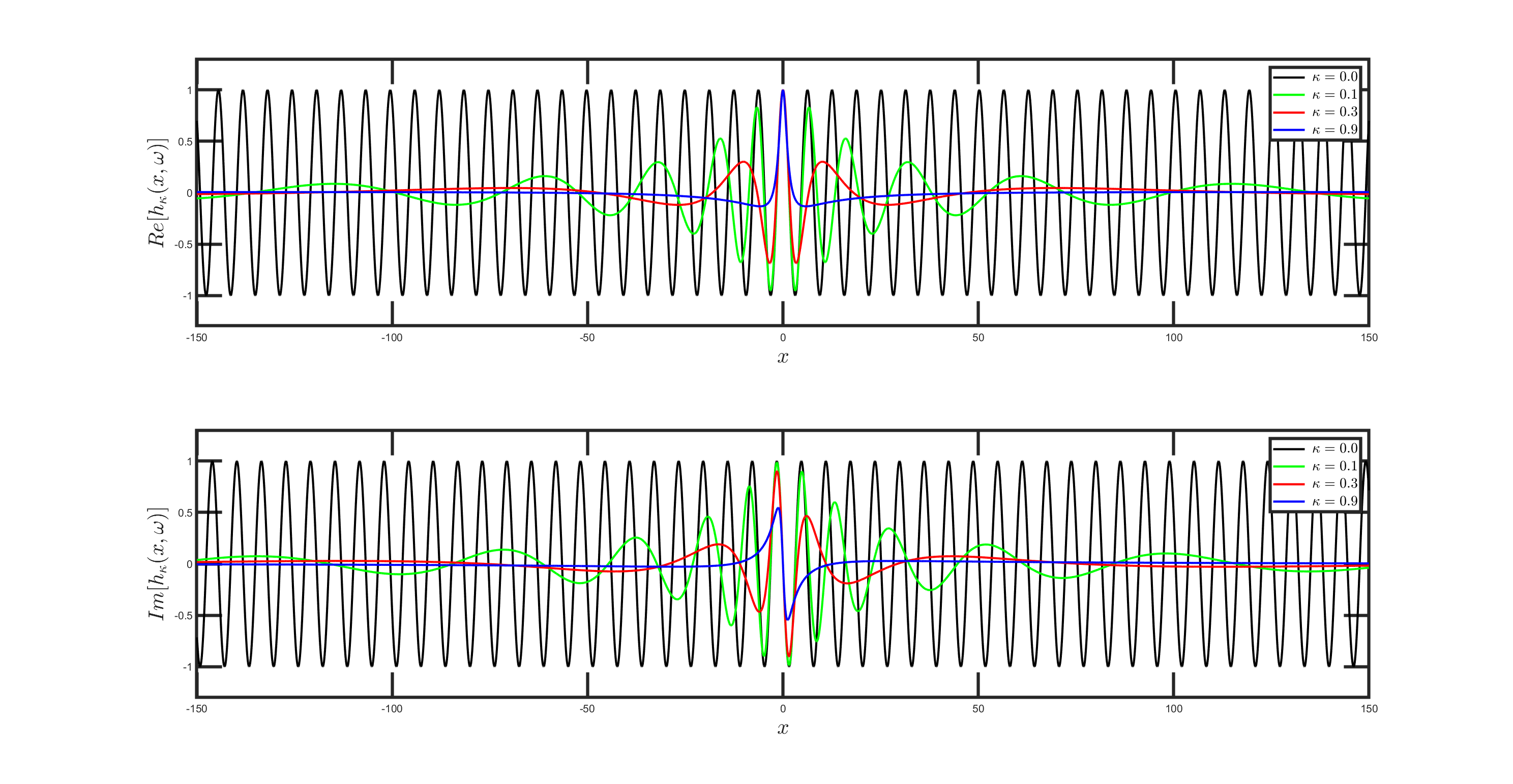
Real (top panel) and imaginary (bottom panel) part of the kernel $h_\kappa(x,\omega)$ for typical $\kappa$-values and $\omega = 1$.

The kernel of the κ-Fourier transform is given by:

$$h_\kappa(x,\omega) = \frac{\exp\left( i \, x_{\{\kappa\}}\,\omega_{\{\kappa\}}\right)}\sqrt{1+\kappa^2\,x^2}$$

The inverse κ-Fourier transform is defined as:

$$\mathcal{F}_\kappa[\hat{f}\!(\omega)](x) = {1\over\sqrt{2\,\pi}}\int_{-\infty}^{\infty} \hat{f}\!(\omega) \exp_\kappa(\omega \otimes_\kappa x)^i\,d_\kappa \omega$$

Let $u_\kappa(x) = \frac 1 \kappa \cosh\Big(\kappa\ln(x) \Big)$, the following table shows the κ-Fourier transforms of several notable functions:

κ-Fourier transform of several functions
| | $f(x)$ | ${\cal F}_\kappa[f(x)](\omega)$ |
|---|---|---|
| Step function | $\theta(x)$ | $\sqrt{2\,\pi}\,\delta(\omega)+{1\over\sqrt{2\,\pi}\,i\,\omega_{\{\kappa\}}}$ |
| Modulation | $\cos_\kappa(a \mathop\oplus^\kappa x)$ | $\sqrt{\pi\over2}\,u_\kappa(\exp_\kappa(a))\,\left(\delta(\omega+a)+\delta(\omega-a)\right)$ |
| Causal $\kappa$-exponential | $\theta(x)\,\exp_\kappa(-a \mathop\otimes^\kappa x)$ | ${1\over\sqrt{2\,\pi}}{1\over a_{\{\kappa\}}+i\,\omega_{\{\kappa\}}}$ |
| Symmetric $\kappa$-exponential | $\exp_\kappa(-a \mathop\otimes^\kappa |x|)$ | $\sqrt{2\over\pi}\,{a_{\{\kappa\}}\over a_{\{\kappa\}}^2+\omega_{\{\kappa\}}^2}$ |
| Constant | $1$ | $\sqrt{2\,\pi}\,\delta(\omega)$ |
| $\kappa$-Phasor | $\exp_\kappa\,(a \mathop\otimes^\kappa x)^i$ | $\sqrt{2\,\pi}\,u_\kappa(\exp_\kappa(a))\,\delta(\omega-a)$ |
| Impuslse | $\delta(x-a)$ | ${1\over\sqrt{2\,\pi}}{\exp_\kappa\,(\omega \mathop\otimes^\kappa a)^i\over u_\kappa\left(\exp_\kappa\,(a)\right)}$ |
| Signum | Sgn$(x)$ | $\sqrt{2\over\pi}\,\,{1\over i\,\omega_{\{\kappa\}}}$ |
| Rectangular | $\Pi\left({x\over a}\right)$ | $\sqrt{2\over\pi}\,\,a_{\{\kappa\}}\,\operatorname{sinc}_\kappa(\omega \mathop\otimes^\kappa a)$ |

The κ-deformed version of the Fourier transform preserves the main properties of the ordinary Fourier transform, as summarized in the following table.

κ-Fourier properties
| $f(x)$ | ${\cal F}_\kappa[f(x)](\omega)$ |
|---|---|
| Linearity | ${\cal F}_\kappa[\alpha\,f(x)+\beta\,g(x)](\omega)=\alpha\,{\cal F}_\kappa[f(x)](\omega)+\beta\,{\cal F}_\kappa[g(x)](\omega)$ |
| Scaling | ${\cal F}_\kappa\left[f(\alpha\,x)\right](\omega)={1\over\alpha}\,{\cal F}_{\kappa^\prime}\left[f(x)\right](\omega^\prime)$ where $\kappa^\prime=\kappa/\alpha$ and $\omega^\prime=(a/\kappa)\,\sinh\left(\operatorname{arsinh}(\kappa\,\omega)/a^2\right)$ |
| $\kappa$-Scaling | ${\cal F}_\kappa\left[f(\alpha \mathop\otimes^\kappa x)\right](\omega)={1\over\alpha_{\{\kappa\}}}\,{\cal F}_\kappa[f(x)]\left(\frac{1}{\alpha}\mathop\otimes^\kappa\omega\right)$ |
| Complex conjugation | ${\cal F}_\kappa\big[f(x)\big]^{\ast}(\omega)={\cal F}_\kappa\big[f(x)\big](-\omega)$ |
| Duality | ${\cal F}_\kappa\Big[{\cal F}_\kappa\big[f(x)\big](\nu)\Big](\omega)=f(-\omega)$ |
| Reverse | ${\cal F}_\kappa\left[f(-x)\right](\omega)={\cal F}_\kappa[f(x)](-\omega)$ |
| $\kappa$-Frequency shift | ${\cal F}_\kappa\left[\exp_\kappa (\omega_0 \mathop\otimes^\kappa x)^if(x)\right](\omega)={\cal F}_\kappa[f(x)](\omega\mathop\ominus^\kappa\omega_0)$ |
| $\kappa$-Time shift | ${\cal F}_\kappa\left[f(x \,\mathop\oplus^\kappa\,x_0)\right](\omega)=\exp_\kappa (\omega\,\mathop\otimes^\kappa\, x_0)^i\, {\cal F}_\kappa[f(x)](\omega)$ |
| Transform of $\kappa$-derivative | ${\cal F}_\kappa\left[\frac{d\,f(x)}{d_\kappa x}\right](\omega)=i\,\omega_{\{\kappa\}}\,{\cal F}_\kappa[f(x)](\omega)$ |
| $\kappa$-Derivative of transform | $\frac{d}{d_\kappa\omega}\,{\cal F}_\kappa[f(x)](\omega)=-i\,\omega_{\{\kappa\}}\,{\cal F}_\kappa\left[x_{\{\kappa\}}\,f(x)\right](\omega)$ |
| Transform of integral | ${\cal F}_\kappa\left[\int_{-\infty}^x f(y)\,dy\right](\omega) = {1\over i \omega_{\{\kappa\}}}{\cal F}_\kappa[f(x)](\omega) + 2\pi \, {\cal F}_\kappa[f(x)](0)\,\delta(\omega)$ |
| $\kappa$-Convolution | ${\cal F}_\kappa\left[(f \,\mathop\circledast^\kappa\, g)(x)\right](\omega)=\sqrt{2\,\pi}\,{\cal F}_\kappa[f(x)](\omega)\,{\cal F}_\kappa[g(x)](\omega)$ where $(f \,\mathop\circledast^\kappa\, g)(x) = \int_{-\infty}^{\infty} f(y) \, g(x \mathop\ominus^\kappa y) \,d_\kappa y$ |
| Modulation | ${\cal F}_\kappa\left[f(x)\,g(x)\right](\omega)={1\over\sqrt{2\,\pi}}\left({\cal F}_\kappa\left[f(x)\right] \,\mathop\circledast^\kappa\, {\cal F}_\kappa\left[g(x)\right]\right)(\omega)$ |

The properties of the κ-Fourier transform presented in the latter table reduce to the corresponding ordinary Fourier transforms in the classical limit $\kappa \to 0$.

== See also ==
- Giorgio Kaniadakis
- Kaniadakis distribution
- Kaniadakis κ-Exponential distribution
- Kaniadakis κ-Gaussian distribution
- Kaniadakis κ-Gamma distribution
- Kaniadakis κ-Weibull distribution
- Kaniadakis κ-Logistic distribution
- Kaniadakis κ-Erlang distribution
