= Giorgio Kaniadakis =

Greek-Italian physicist

- Γεώργιος Κανιαδάκης
- Born: June 5, 1957 (age 68); Chania, Greece
- Education: Ph.D. in Physics Politecnico di Torino, M.S. in Nuclear Physics Università di Torino, M.S. and B.S. in Nuclear Engineering Politecnico di Torino
- Known for: Kaniadakis entropy and Kaniadakis statistics
- Scientific career
- Fields: Statistical Physics
- Institutions: Politecnico di Torino

Giorgio Kaniadakis (Greek: Κανιαδάκης Γεώργιος; born on 5 June 1957 in Chania-Crete, Greece) a Greek-Italian physicist, is a Full Professor of Theoretical Physics at Politecnico di Torino, Italy, and is credited with introducing the concept of Kaniadakis entropy and what is known as Kaniadakis statistics. Giorgio Kaniadakis is the founder and chairman of the SigmaPhi International Conference on Statistical Physics, which is organized every three years in collaboration with the European Physical Society.

== Education ==
In 1975 Giorgio Kaniadakis moved to Italy where he obtained the Bachelor's and Master's degrees in Nuclear Engineering in 1981 from Politecnico di Torino. In 1985, he obtained a Master's degree in Nuclear Physics from Università di Torino (Italy) and in 1989 he received a Ph.D. degree in Physics from Politecnico di Torino with grant of the International Center for Theoretical Physics (ICTP) of Trieste, Italy.

== Career ==
Since 1991 Kaniadakis is a permanent faculty member at Department of Physics (now Department of Applied Science and Technology) of the Politecnico di Torino as Researcher, Senior Researcher (1994), Aggregate Professor (2010), Associate Professor (2014), and Full Professor (2019).

== Research ==
Kaniadakis statistics (known also as κ-statistics) is a theory based on Kaniadakis entropy (known also as κ-entropy) that was introduced in the trilogy of papers published between 2001 and 2005. Kaniadakis statistics can be traced back to the first principles of Special Relativity. It answers the open problem on how the temperature of a body is transformed in a moving inertial frame by selecting the Planck-Einstein transformation law. Within κ-statistics, Kaniadakis entropy emerges as the relativistic generalization of Boltzmann's entropy exactly as happens with relativistic energy which turns out to be the relativistic generalization of energy of classical physics. Kaniadakis' theoretical framework, alongside the proposed statistical theory, also provides a mathematical formalism (also known as κ-mathematics) which is isomorphic to ordinary mathematics.

Cosmic rays are a relativistic particle system composed of normal nuclei as in the standard cosmic abundances of matter, and approximately can be viewed as an equivalent statistical system of identical relativistic particles with masses near the mass of the proton. For a long time, it has been known that the cosmic ray spectrum is not exponential, and then it violates the Boltzmann statistics. The presence in the cosmic ray spectrum of power-law tails, which extends over 13 decades in energy and spans 33 decades in particle flux, represents an important experimental test of the correctness and predictability of Kaniadakis statistics.

The statistical theory rooted on Kaniadakis entropy has significantly influenced scientific literature, both in establishing its theoretical foundations and in numerous application areas.

== See also ==
- Kaniadakis statistics
- Kaniadakis distribution
- Kaniadakis κ-Exponential distribution
- Kaniadakis κ-Gaussian distribution
- Kaniadakis κ-Gamma distribution
- Kaniadakis κ-Weibull distribution
- Kaniadakis κ-Logistic distribution
- Kaniadakis κ-Erlang distribution
