= Kaniadakis Erlang distribution =

Continuous probability distribution

κ-Erlang distribution
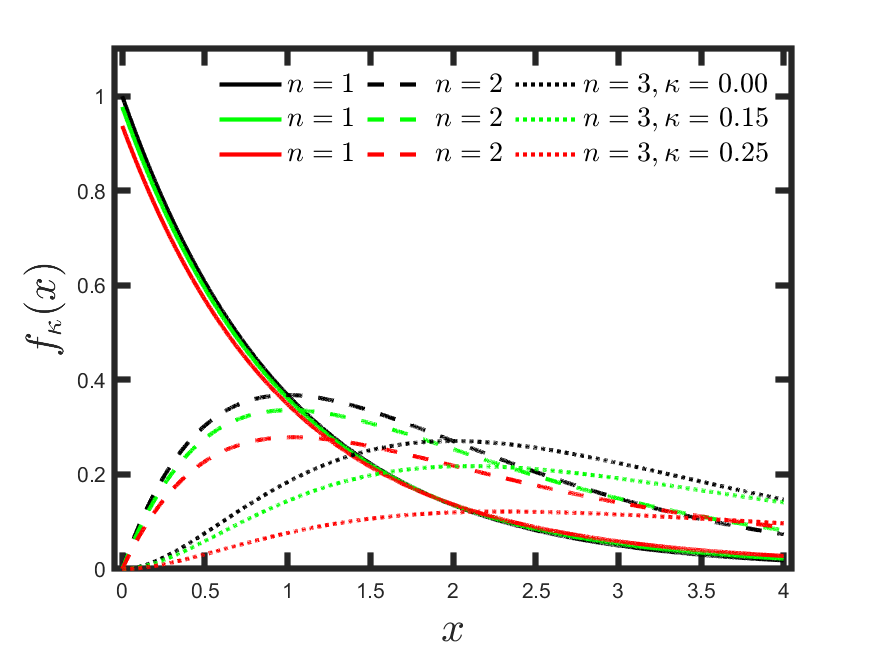
- Probability density function Plot of the κ-Erlang distribution for typical κ-values and n=1, 2,3. The case κ=0 corresponds to the ordinary Erlang distribution.
- Parameters: $0 \leq \kappa < 1$ $n = \textrm{positive} \,\,\textrm{integer}$
- Support: $x \in [0, +\infty)$
- PDF: $\prod_{m = 0}^n \left[ 1 + (2m -n)\kappa \right] \frac{ x^{n - 1} }{ (n - 1)! } \exp_\kappa(-x)$
- CDF: $\frac{1}{ (n - 1)! } \prod_{m = 0}^n \left[ 1 + (2m -n)\kappa \right] \int_0^x z^{n - 1} \exp_\kappa(-z) dz$

The Kaniadakis Erlang distribution (or κ-Erlang Gamma distribution) is a family of continuous statistical distributions, which is a particular case of the κ-Gamma distribution, when $\alpha = 1$ and $\nu = n =$ positive integer. The first member of this family is the κ-exponential distribution of Type I. The κ-Erlang is a κ-deformed version of the Erlang distribution. It is one example of a Kaniadakis distribution.

== Characterization ==
=== Probability density function ===
The Kaniadakis κ-Erlang distribution has the following probability density function:

$$f_{_{\kappa}}(x) = \frac{1}{ (n - 1)! } \prod_{m = 0}^n \left[ 1 + (2m -n)\kappa \right] x^{n - 1} \exp_\kappa(-x)$$

valid for $x \geq 0$ and $n = \textrm{positive} \,\,\textrm{integer}$, where $0 \leq |\kappa| < 1$ is the entropic index associated with the Kaniadakis entropy.

The ordinary Erlang Distribution is recovered as $\kappa \rightarrow 0$.

=== Cumulative distribution function ===
The cumulative distribution function of κ-Erlang distribution assumes the form:

$$F_\kappa(x) = \frac{1}{ (n - 1)! } \prod_{m = 0}^n \left[ 1 + (2m -n)\kappa \right] \int_0^x z^{n - 1} \exp_\kappa(-z) dz$$

valid for $x \geq 0$, where $0 \leq |\kappa| < 1$. The cumulative Erlang distribution is recovered in the classical limit $\kappa \rightarrow 0$.

=== Survival distribution and hazard functions ===
The survival function of the κ-Erlang distribution is given by:
$$S_\kappa(x) = 1 - \frac{1}{ (n - 1)! } \prod_{m = 0}^n \left[ 1 + (2m -n)\kappa \right] \int_0^x z^{n - 1} \exp_\kappa(-z) dz$$
The survival function of the κ-Erlang distribution enables the determination of hazard functions in closed form through the solution of the κ-rate equation:
$$\frac{ S_\kappa(x) }{ dx } = -h_\kappa S_\kappa(x)$$
where $h_\kappa$ is the hazard function.

== Family distribution ==
A family of κ-distributions arises from the κ-Erlang distribution, each associated with a specific value of $n$, valid for $x \ge 0$ and $0 \leq |\kappa| < 1$. Such members are determined from the κ-Erlang cumulative distribution, which can be rewritten as:

$$F_\kappa(x) = 1 - \left[ R_\kappa(x) + Q_\kappa(x) \sqrt{1 + \kappa^2 x^2} \right] \exp_\kappa(-x)$$

where

$$Q_\kappa(x) = N_\kappa \sum_{m=0}^{n-3} \left( m + 1 \right) c_{m+1} x^m + \frac{N_\kappa}{1-n^2\kappa^2} x^{n-1}$$
$$R_\kappa(x) = N_\kappa \sum_{m=0}^{n} c_{m} x^m$$

with

$$N_\kappa = \frac{1}{ (n - 1)! } \prod_{m = 0}^n \left[ 1 + (2m -n)\kappa \right]$$
$$c_n = \frac{ n\kappa^2 }{ 1 - n^2 \kappa^2}$$
$$c_{n - 1} =0$$
$$c_{n - 2} = \frac{ n - 1 }{ (1 - n^2 \kappa^2) [1 - (n-2)^2\kappa^2]}$$
$$c_m = \frac{ (m + 1)(m+2) }{ 1 - m^2 \kappa^2} c_{m+2} \quad \textrm{for} \quad 0 \leq m \leq n-3$$

=== First member ===
The first member ($n = 1$) of the κ-Erlang family is the κ-Exponential distribution of type I, in which the probability density function and the cumulative distribution function are defined as:

$$f_{_{\kappa}}(x) = (1 - \kappa^2) \exp_\kappa(-x)$$
$$F_\kappa(x) = 1-\Big(\sqrt{1+\kappa^2 x^2} + \kappa^2 x \Big)\exp_k({-x)}$$

=== Second member ===
The second member ($n = 2$) of the κ-Erlang family has the probability density function and the cumulative distribution function defined as:

$$f_{_{\kappa}}(x) = (1 - 4\kappa^2)\,x \,\exp_\kappa(-x)$$
$$F_\kappa(x) = 1-\left(2\kappa^2 x^2 + 1 + x\sqrt{1+\kappa^2 x^2} \right) \exp_k({-x)}$$

=== Third member ===
The second member ($n = 3$) has the probability density function and the cumulative distribution function defined as:

$$f_{_{\kappa}}(x) = \frac{1}{2} (1 - \kappa^2) (1 - 9\kappa^2)\,x^2 \,\exp_\kappa(-x)$$
$$F_\kappa(x) = 1-\left\{ \frac{3}{2} \kappa^2(1 - \kappa^2)x^3 + x + \left[ 1 + \frac{1}{2}(1-\kappa^2)x^2 \right] \sqrt{1+\kappa^2 x^2}\right\} \exp_\kappa(-x)$$

== Related distributions ==
- The κ-Exponential distribution of type I is a particular case of the κ-Erlang distribution when $n = 1$;
- A κ-Erlang distribution corresponds to am ordinary exponential distribution when $\kappa = 0$ and $n = 1$;

== See also ==
- Giorgio Kaniadakis
- Kaniadakis statistics
- Kaniadakis distribution
- Kaniadakis κ-Exponential distribution
- Kaniadakis κ-Gaussian distribution
- Kaniadakis κ-Gamma distribution
- Kaniadakis κ-Weibull distribution
- Kaniadakis κ-Logistic distribution
