= Kaniadakis Gaussian distribution =

Continuous probability distribution

κ-Gaussian distribution
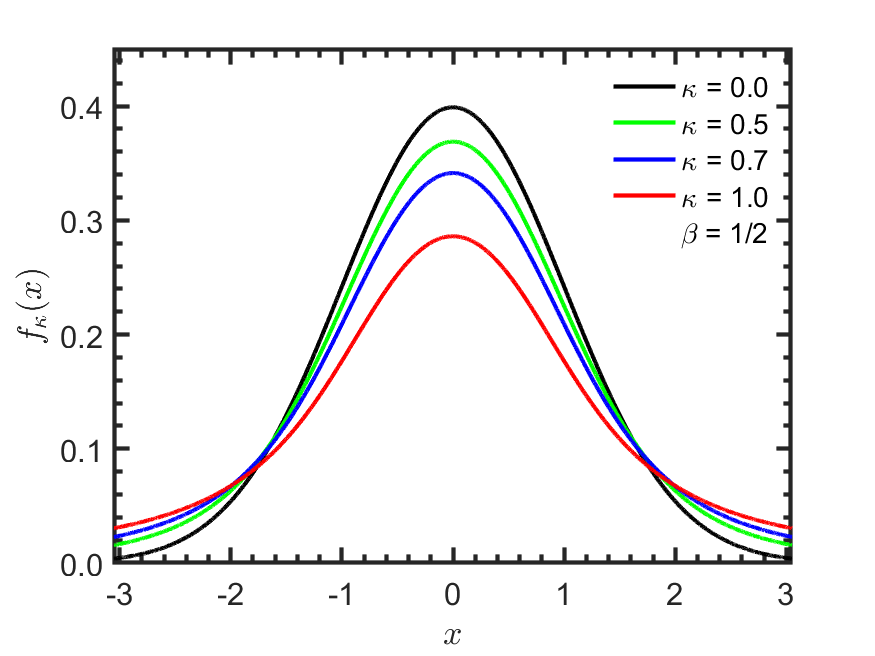
- Probability density function

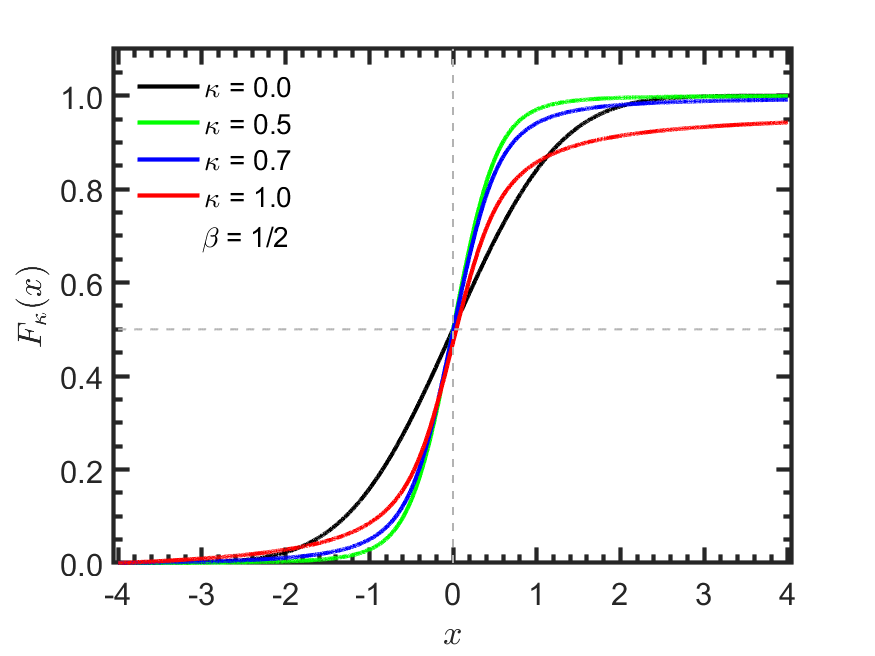
- Cumulative distribution function
- Parameters: $0 < \kappa < 1$ shape (real) $\beta> 0$ rate (real)
- Support: $x \in \mathbb{R}$
- PDF: $Z_\kappa \exp_\kappa(-\beta x^2) \, \, \, ; \, \, \, Z_\kappa = \sqrt{\frac{2 \beta \kappa}{ \pi } } \Bigg( 1 + \frac{1}{2}\kappa \Bigg) \frac{ \Gamma \Big( \frac{1}{2 \kappa} + \frac{1}{4}\Big)}{ \Gamma \Big( \frac{1}{2 \kappa} - \frac{1}{4}\Big) }$
- CDF: $\frac{1}{2} + \frac{1}{2} \textrm{erf}_\kappa \big( \sqrt{\beta} x\big)\$
- Mean: $0$
- Median: $0$
- Mode: $0$
- Variance: $\sigma_\kappa^2 = \frac{1}{\beta} \frac{2 + \kappa}{2 - \kappa} \frac{4\kappa}{4 - 9 \kappa^2 } \left[ \frac{\Gamma \Big( \frac{1}{2\kappa} + \frac{1}{ 4 }\Big)}{\Gamma \Big( \frac{1}{2\kappa} - \frac{1}{ 4 }\Big)} \right]^2$
- Skewness: $0$
- Excess kurtosis: $3\left[\frac{\sqrt{\pi} Z_\kappa}{ 2 \beta^{2/3} \sigma_\kappa^4 } \frac{ (2 \kappa)^{-5/2} }{1+\frac{5}{2} \kappa } \frac{\Gamma \left( \frac{1}{ 2 \kappa } - \frac{5}{4} \right)}{\Gamma \left( \frac{1}{ 2 \kappa } + \frac{5}{4} \right)} -1 \right]$

The Kaniadakis Gaussian distribution (also known as κ-Gaussian distribution) is a probability distribution which arises as a generalization of the Gaussian distribution from the maximization of the Kaniadakis entropy under appropriated constraints. It is one example of a Kaniadakis κ-distribution. The κ-Gaussian distribution has been applied successfully for describing several complex systems in economy, geophysics, astrophysics, among many others.

The κ-Gaussian distribution is a particular case of the κ-Generalized Gamma distribution.

== Definitions ==
=== Probability density function ===
The general form of the centered Kaniadakis κ-Gaussian probability density function is:

$$f_{_{\kappa}}(x) = Z_\kappa \exp_\kappa(-\beta x^2)$$

where $|\kappa| < 1$ is the entropic index associated with the Kaniadakis entropy, $\beta > 0$ is the scale parameter, and

$$Z_\kappa = \sqrt{\frac{2 \beta \kappa}{ \pi } } \Bigg( 1 + \frac{1}{2}\kappa \Bigg)
\frac{ \Gamma \Big( \frac{1}{2 \kappa} + \frac{1}{4}\Big)}{ \Gamma \Big( \frac{1}{2 \kappa} - \frac{1}{4}\Big) }$$

is the normalization constant.

The standard Normal distribution is recovered in the limit $\kappa \rightarrow 0.$

=== Cumulative distribution function ===
The cumulative distribution function of κ-Gaussian distribution is given by

$F_\kappa(x) = \frac{1}{2} + \frac{1}{2} \textrm{erf}_\kappa \big( \sqrt{\beta} x\big)$

where

$\textrm{erf}_\kappa(x) = \Big( 2+ \kappa \Big) \sqrt{ \frac{2 \kappa}{\pi} } \frac{\Gamma\Big( \frac{1}{2\kappa} + \frac{1}{4} \Big)}{ \Gamma\Big( \frac{1}{2\kappa} - \frac{1}{4} \Big) } \int_0^x \exp_\kappa(-t^2 ) dt$

is the Kaniadakis κ-Error function, which is a generalization of the ordinary Error function $\textrm{erf}(x)$ as $\kappa \rightarrow 0$.

== Properties ==
=== Moments, mean and variance ===
The centered κ-Gaussian distribution has a moment of odd order equal to zero, including the mean.

The variance is finite for $\kappa < 2/3$ and is given by:

$$\operatorname{Var}[X] = \sigma_\kappa^2 = \frac{1}{\beta} \frac{2 + \kappa}{2 - \kappa} \frac{4\kappa}{4 - 9 \kappa^2 } \left[\frac{\Gamma \left( \frac{1}{2\kappa} + \frac{1}{ 4 }\right)}{\Gamma \left( \frac{1}{2\kappa} - \frac{1}{ 4 }\right)}\right]^2$$

=== Kurtosis ===
The kurtosis of the centered κ-Gaussian distribution may be computed thought:

$$\operatorname{Kurt}[X] = \operatorname{E}\left[\frac{X^4}{\sigma_\kappa^4}\right]$$

which can be written as

$\operatorname{Kurt}[X] = \frac{2 Z_\kappa}{\sigma_\kappa^4} \int_0^\infty x^4 \, \exp_\kappa \left( -\beta x^2 \right) dx$

Thus, the kurtosis of the centered κ-Gaussian distribution is given by:

$\operatorname{Kurt}[X] = \frac{3\sqrt \pi Z_\kappa}{ 2 \beta^{2/3} \sigma_\kappa^4 } \frac{|2 \kappa|^{-5/2}}{1+\frac{5}{2} |\kappa| } \frac{\Gamma \left( \frac{1}{|2 \kappa| } - \frac{5}{4} \right)}{\Gamma \left( \frac{1}{|2 \kappa| } + \frac{5}{4} \right)}$

or

$\operatorname{Kurt}[X] = \frac{ 3\beta^{11/6}\sqrt{2 \kappa} }{ 2 } \frac{|2 \kappa|^{-5/2}}{1+\frac{5}{2} |\kappa| } \Bigg( 1 + \frac{1}{2}\kappa \Bigg) \left(\frac{2 - \kappa}{2 + \kappa} \right)^2 \left( \frac{4 - 9 \kappa^2 }{4\kappa} \right)^2 \left[\frac{\Gamma \Big( \frac{1}{2\kappa} - \frac{1}{ 4 }\Big)}{\Gamma \Big( \frac{1}{2\kappa} + \frac{1}{ 4 }\Big)}\right]^3 \frac{\Gamma \left( \frac{1}{|2 \kappa| } - \frac{5}{4} \right)}{\Gamma \left( \frac{1}{|2 \kappa| } + \frac{5}{4} \right)}$

== κ-Error function ==
κ-Error function
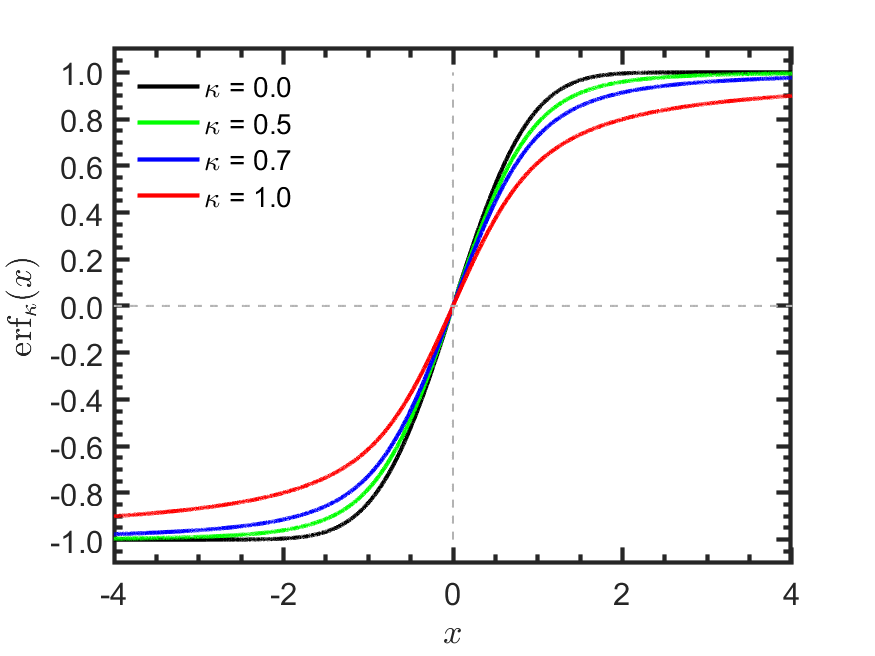
- Plot of the κ-error function for typical κ-values. The case κ=0 corresponds to the ordinary error function.

General information
- General definition: $\operatorname{erf}_\kappa(x) = \Big( 2+ \kappa \Big) \sqrt{ \frac{2 \kappa}{\pi} } \frac{\Gamma\Big( \frac{1}{2\kappa} + \frac{1}{4} \Big)}{ \Gamma\Big( \frac{1}{2\kappa} - \frac{1}{4} \Big) } \int_0^x \exp_\kappa(-t^2 ) dt$
- Fields of application: Probability, thermodynamics

Domain, codomain and image
- Domain: $\mathbb{C}$
- Image: $\left( -1,1 \right)$

Specific features
- Root: $0$
- Derivative: $\frac{d}{dx}\operatorname{erf}_\kappa(x) = \left( 2+ \kappa \right) \sqrt{ \frac{2 \kappa}{\pi} } \frac{\Gamma \left( \frac{1}{2 \kappa} + \frac{1}{4} \right)}{ \Gamma \left( \frac{1}{2 \kappa} - \frac{1}{4} \right) } \exp_\kappa(-x^2 )$

The Kaniadakis κ-Error function (or κ-Error function) is a one-parameter generalization of the ordinary error function defined as:

$$\operatorname{erf}_\kappa(x) = \Big(  2+ \kappa \Big) \sqrt{ \frac{2 \kappa}{\pi} } \frac{\Gamma\Big( \frac{1}{2\kappa} + \frac{1}{4}  \Big)}{ \Gamma\Big( \frac{1}{2\kappa} - \frac{1}{4}  \Big) }  \int_0^x \exp_\kappa(-t^2 )
dt$$

Although the error function cannot be expressed in terms of elementary functions, numerical approximations are commonly employed.

For a random variable X distributed according to a κ-Gaussian distribution with mean 0 and standard deviation $\sqrt \beta$, κ-Error function means the probability that X falls in the interval $[-x, \, x]$.

== Applications ==
The κ-Gaussian distribution has been applied in several areas, such as:

- In economy, the κ-Gaussian distribution has been applied in the analysis of financial models, accurately representing the dynamics of the processes of extreme changes in stock prices.
- In inverse problems, Error laws in extreme statistics are robustly represented by κ-Gaussian distributions.
- In astrophysics, stellar-residual-radial-velocity data have a Gaussian-type statistical distribution, in which the K index presents a strong relationship with the stellar-cluster ages.
- In nuclear physics, the study of Doppler broadening function in nuclear reactors is well described by a κ-Gaussian distribution for analyzing the neutron-nuclei interaction.
- In cosmology, for interpreting the dynamical evolution of the Friedmann–Robertson–Walker Universe.
- In plasmas physics, for analyzing the electron distribution in electron-acoustic double-layers and the dispersion of Langmuir waves.

== See also ==
- Giorgio Kaniadakis
- Kaniadakis statistics
- Kaniadakis distribution
- Kaniadakis κ-Exponential distribution
- Kaniadakis κ-Gamma distribution
- Kaniadakis κ-Weibull distribution
- Kaniadakis κ-Logistic distribution
- Kaniadakis κ-Erlang distribution
