= Kaniadakis logistic distribution =

Probability distribution

κ-Logistic distribution
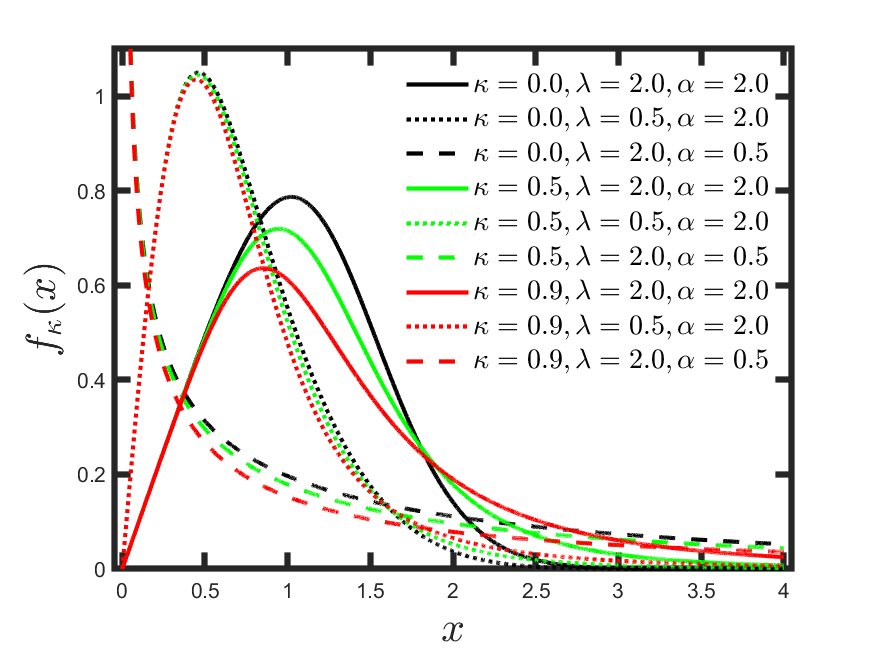
- Probability density function Plot of the κ-Logistic distribution for typical κ-values and $\beta = 1$. The case $\kappa = 0$ corresponds to the ordinary Logistic distribution.

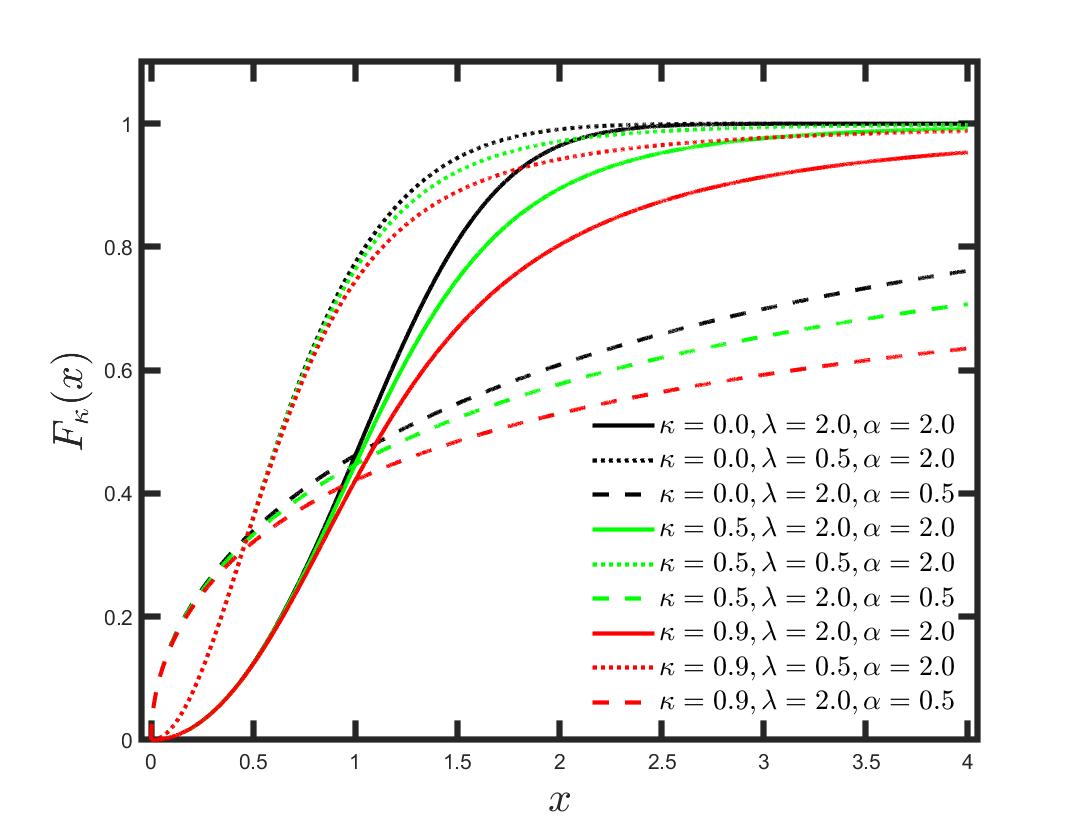
- Cumulative distribution function Plots of the cumulative κ-Logistic distribution for typical κ-values and $\beta = 1$. The case $\kappa = 0$ corresponds to the ordinary Logistic case.
- Parameters: $0 \leq \kappa < 1$ $\alpha > 0$ shape (real) $\beta> 0$ rate (real) $\lambda > 0$
- Support: $x \in [0, \infty)$
- PDF: $\frac{\lambda \alpha \beta x^{\alpha-1} }{\sqrt{1+\kappa^2 \beta^2 x^{2\alpha} } } \frac{ \exp_\kappa(-\beta x^\alpha) }{ [ 1 + (\lambda - 1) \exp_\kappa(-\beta x^\alpha)]^2 }$
- CDF: $\frac{ 1 - \exp_\kappa(-\beta x^\alpha) }{ 1 + (\lambda - 1) \exp_\kappa(-\beta x^\alpha) }$

The Kaniadakis Logistic distribution (also known as κ-Logisticdistribution) is a generalized version of the Logistic distribution associated with the Kaniadakis statistics. It is one example of a Kaniadakis distribution. The κ-Logistic probability distribution describes the population kinetics behavior of bosonic ($0 < \lambda < 1$) or fermionic ($\lambda > 1$) character.

== Definitions ==
=== Probability density function ===
The Kaniadakis κ-Logistic distribution is a four-parameter family of continuous statistical distributions, which is part of a class of statistical distributions emerging from the Kaniadakis κ-statistics. This distribution has the following probability density function:

$$f_{_{\kappa}}(x) =
\frac{\lambda \alpha \beta x^{\alpha-1}}{\sqrt{1+\kappa^2 \beta^2 x^{2\alpha} }} \frac{ \exp_\kappa(-\beta x^\alpha) }{ [ 1 + (\lambda - 1) \exp_\kappa(-\beta x^\alpha)]^2 }$$

valid for $x \geq 0$, where $0 \leq |\kappa| < 1$ is the entropic index associated with the Kaniadakis entropy, $\beta > 0$ is the rate parameter, $\lambda > 0$, and $\alpha > 0$ is the shape parameter.

The Logistic distribution is recovered as $\kappa \rightarrow 0.$

=== Cumulative distribution function ===
The cumulative distribution function of κ-Logistic is given by

$$F_\kappa(x) =
\frac{ 1 - \exp_\kappa(-\beta x^\alpha) }{  1 + (\lambda - 1) \exp_\kappa(-\beta x^\alpha) }$$

valid for $x \geq 0$. The cumulative Logistic distribution is recovered in the classical limit $\kappa \rightarrow 0$.

=== Survival and hazard functions ===
The survival distribution function of κ-Logistic distribution is given by

$$S_\kappa(x) =
\frac{\lambda}{\exp_\kappa(\beta x^\alpha) + \lambda - 1}$$

valid for $x \geq 0$. The survival Logistic distribution is recovered in the classical limit $\kappa \rightarrow 0$.

The hazard function associated with the κ-Logistic distribution is obtained by the solution of the following evolution equation:

$\frac{ S_\kappa(x) }{ dx } = -h_\kappa S_\kappa(x) \left( 1 - \frac{ \lambda -1 }{ \lambda } S_\kappa(x) \right)$

with $S_\kappa(0) = 1$, where $h_\kappa$ is the hazard function:

$$h_\kappa = \frac{\alpha \beta x^{\alpha-1}}{\sqrt{1+\kappa^2 \beta^2 x^{2\alpha} }}$$

The cumulative Kaniadakis κ-Logistic distribution is related to the hazard function by the following expression:

$$S_\kappa = e^{-H_\kappa(x)}$$

where $H_\kappa (x) = \int_0^x h_\kappa(z) dz$ is the cumulative hazard function. The cumulative hazard function of the Logistic distribution is recovered in the classical limit $\kappa \rightarrow 0$.

== Related distributions ==
- The survival function of the κ-Logistic distribution represents the κ-deformation of the Fermi-Dirac function, and becomes a Fermi-Dirac distribution in the classical limit $\kappa \rightarrow 0$.
- The κ-Logistic distribution is a generalization of the κ-Weibull distribution when $\lambda = 1$.
- A κ-Logistic distribution corresponds to a Half-Logistic distribution when $\lambda = 2$, $\alpha = 1$ and $\kappa = 0$.
- The ordinary Logistic distribution is a particular case of a κ-Logistic distribution, when $\kappa = 0$.

== Applications ==
The κ-Logistic distribution has been applied in several areas, such as:

- In quantum statistics, the survival function of the κ-Logistic distribution represents the most general expression of the Fermi-Dirac function, reducing to the Fermi-Dirac distribution in the limit $\kappa \rightarrow 0$.

== See also ==
- Giorgio Kaniadakis
- Kaniadakis statistics
- Kaniadakis distribution
- Kaniadakis κ-Exponential distribution
- Kaniadakis κ-Gaussian distribution
- Kaniadakis κ-Gamma distribution
- Kaniadakis κ-Weibull distribution
- Kaniadakis κ-Erlang distribution
