= QPD =

QPD may refer to:

- Quantile-parameterized distribution, probability distributions that are directly parameterized by data
- Quasiprobability distribution, a mathematical object similar to a probability distribution
- Quebec platelet disorder, a rare autosomal dominant bleeding disorder
