= Inverse-chi-squared distribution =

Probability distribution

Inverse-chi-squared
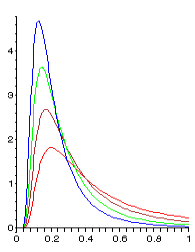
- Probability density function

- Cumulative distribution function
- Parameters: $\nu > 0\!$
- Support: $x \in (0, \infty)\!$
- PDF: $\frac{2^{-\nu/2}}{\Gamma(\nu/2)}\,x^{-\nu/2-1} e^{-1/(2 x)}\!$
- CDF: $\Gamma\!\left(\frac{\nu}{2},\frac{1}{2x}\right) \bigg/\, \Gamma\!\left(\frac{\nu}{2}\right)\!$
- Mean: $\frac{1}{\nu-2}\!$ for $\nu >2\!$
- Median: $\approx \dfrac{1}{\nu\bigg(1-\dfrac{2}{9\nu}\bigg)^3}$
- Mode: $\frac{1}{\nu+2}\!$
- Variance: $\frac{2}{(\nu-2)^2 (\nu-4)}\!$ for $\nu >4\!$
- Skewness: $\frac{4}{\nu-6}\sqrt{2(\nu-4)}\!$ for $\nu >6\!$
- Excess kurtosis: $\frac{12(5\nu-22)}{(\nu-6)(\nu-8)}\!$ for $\nu >8\!$
- Entropy: $\frac{\nu}{2} \!+\!\ln\!\left(\frac{\nu}{2}\Gamma\!\left(\frac{\nu}{2}\right)\right)$ $\!-\!\left(1\!+\!\frac{\nu}{2}\right)\psi\!\left(\frac{\nu}{2}\right)$
- MGF: $\frac{2}{\Gamma(\frac{\nu}{2})} \left(\frac{-t}{2i}\right)^{\!\!\frac{\nu}{4}} K_{\frac{\nu}{2}}\!\left(\sqrt{-2t}\right)$; does not exist as real valued function
- CF: $\frac{2}{\Gamma(\frac{\nu}{2})} \left(\frac{-it}{2}\right)^{\!\!\frac{\nu}{4}} K_{\frac{\nu}{2}}\!\left(\sqrt{-2it}\right)$

In probability and statistics, the inverse-chi-squared distribution (or inverted-chi-square distribution) is a continuous probability distribution of a positive-valued random variable. It is closely related to the chi-squared distribution. It is used in Bayesian inference as conjugate prior for the variance of the normal distribution.

== Definition ==
The inverse chi-squared distribution (or inverted-chi-square distribution ) is the probability distribution of a random variable whose multiplicative inverse (reciprocal) has a chi-squared distribution.

If $X$ follows a chi-squared distribution with $\nu$ degrees of freedom then $1/X$ follows the inverse chi-squared distribution with $\nu$ degrees of freedom.

The probability density function of the inverse chi-squared distribution is given by

$$f(x; \nu) = \frac{2^{-\nu/2}}{\Gamma(\nu/2)}\,x^{-\nu/2-1}  e^{-1/(2 x)}$$

In the above $x>0$ and $\nu$ is the degrees of freedom parameter. Further, $\Gamma$ is the gamma function.

The inverse chi-squared distribution is a special case of the inverse-gamma distribution. with shape parameter $\alpha = \frac{\nu}{2}$ and scale parameter $\beta = \frac{1}{2}$.

== Related distributions ==
- chi-squared: If $X \thicksim \chi^2(\nu)$ and $Y = \frac{1}{X}$, then $Y \thicksim \text{Inv-}\chi^2(\nu)$
- scaled-inverse chi-squared: If $X \thicksim \text{Scale-inv-}\chi^2(\nu, 1/\nu) \,$, then $X \thicksim \text{inv-}\chi^2(\nu)$
- Inverse gamma with $\alpha = \frac{\nu}{2}$ and $\beta = \frac{1}{2}$
- Inverse chi-squared distribution is a special case of type 5 Pearson distribution

== See also ==
- Scaled-inverse-chi-squared distribution
- Inverse-Wishart distribution
