= Jane M. Booker =

American statistician

Jane M. Booker is an American statistician, formerly a research in the Statistical Sciences Group of the Los Alamos National Laboratory. She is known for her work on expert elicitation and on using probability theory to formalize reasoning from fuzzy logic.

== Education and career ==
Booker became a researcher at the Los Alamos National Laboratory in 1980, and retired by 2006.

== Books ==
Booker is the coauthor of the book Eliciting and Analyzing Expert Judgment: A Practical Guide (with Mary A. Meyer, Academic Press, 1991; reprinted by the Society for Industrial and Applied Mathematics, 2001).

With Timothy J. Ross and W. Jerry Parkinson, she is the coeditor of Fuzzy Logic and Probability Applications: Bridging the Gap (Society for Industrial and Applied Mathematics, 2002).

== Recognition ==
Booker was elected as a Fellow of the American Statistical Association in 1999.

Also in 1999, the Performance and Reliability Evaluation with Diverse Information Combination and Tracking (PREDICT) technique, developed jointly by Los Alamos and Delphi Automotive Systems using material from Booker's book on judgment elicitation, was a winner of the R&D 100 Awards.
