= Inverse-gamma distribution =

Two-parameter family of continuous probability distributions

Inverse-gamma
- Probability density function

- Cumulative distribution function
- Parameters: $\alpha>0$ shape (real) $\beta>0$ scale (real)
- Support: $x\in(0,\infty)\!$
- PDF: $\frac{\beta^\alpha}{\Gamma(\alpha)} x^{-\alpha - 1} \exp \left(-\frac{\beta}{x}\right)$
- CDF: $\frac{\Gamma(\alpha,\beta/x)}{\Gamma(\alpha)} \!$
- Mean: $\frac{\beta }{\alpha-1}\!$ for $\alpha > 1$
- Mode: $\frac{\beta}{\alpha+1}\!$
- Variance: $\frac{\beta^2}{(\alpha-1)^2(\alpha-2)}\!$ for $\alpha > 2$
- Skewness: $\frac{4\sqrt{\alpha-2}}{\alpha-3}\!$ for $\alpha > 3$
- Excess kurtosis: $\frac{6(5\,\alpha-11)}{(\alpha-3)(\alpha-4)}\!$ for $\alpha > 4$
- Entropy: $\alpha\!+\!\ln(\beta\Gamma(\alpha))\!-\!(1\!+\!\alpha)\psi(\alpha)$ (see digamma function)
- MGF: Does not exist.
- CF: $\frac{2\left(-i\beta t\right)^{\!\!\frac{\alpha}{2}}}{\Gamma(\alpha)}K_{\alpha}\left(\sqrt{-4i\beta t}\right)$

In probability theory and statistics, the inverse gamma distribution is a two-parameter family of continuous probability distributions on the positive real line, which is the distribution of the reciprocal of a variable distributed according to the gamma distribution.

Perhaps the chief use of the inverse gamma distribution is in Bayesian statistics, where the distribution arises as the marginal posterior distribution for the unknown variance of a normal distribution, if an uninformative prior is used, and as an analytically tractable conjugate prior, if an informative prior is required. It is common among some Bayesians to consider an alternative parametrization of the normal distribution in terms of the precision, defined as the reciprocal of the variance, which allows the gamma distribution to be used directly as a conjugate prior. Other Bayesians prefer to parametrize the inverse gamma distribution differently, as a scaled inverse chi-squared distribution.

== Characterization ==
=== Probability density function ===
The inverse gamma distribution's probability density function is defined over the support $x > 0$

$$f(x; \alpha, \beta)
= \frac{\beta^\alpha}{\Gamma(\alpha)}
(1/x)^{\alpha + 1}\exp\left(-\beta/x\right)$$

with shape parameter $\alpha$ and scale parameter $\beta$. Here $\Gamma(\cdot)$ denotes the gamma function.

Unlike the gamma distribution, which contains a somewhat similar exponential term, $\beta$ is a scale parameter as the density function satisfies:

$$f(x; \alpha, \beta)
= \frac{f(x / \beta; \alpha, 1)}{\beta}$$

=== Cumulative distribution function ===
The cumulative distribution function is the regularized gamma function

$$F(x; \alpha, \beta) = \frac{\Gamma\left(\alpha,\frac{\beta}{x}\right)}{\Gamma(\alpha)} = Q\left(\alpha, \frac{\beta}{x}\right)\!$$

where the numerator is the upper incomplete gamma function and the denominator is the gamma function. Many math packages allow direct computation of $Q$, the regularized gamma function.

=== Moments ===
Provided that $\alpha > n$, the $n$-th moment of the inverse gamma distribution is given by

$$\mathrm{E}[X^n] = \beta^n \frac{\Gamma(\alpha - n)}{\Gamma(\alpha)} = \frac{\beta^n}{(\alpha - 1) \cdots (\alpha - n)}.$$

=== Characteristic function ===
The inverse gamma distribution has characteristic function
$$\frac{2\left(-i\beta t\right)^{\!\!\frac{\alpha}{2}}}{\Gamma(\alpha)}K_{\alpha}\left(\sqrt{-4i\beta t}\right)$$
where $K_\alpha$ is the modified Bessel function of the 2nd kind.

== Properties ==
For $\alpha>0$ and $\beta>0$,

$$\mathbb{E}[\ln(X)] = \ln(\beta) - \psi(\alpha)\,$$

and

$$\mathbb{E}[X^{-1}] = \frac{\alpha}{\beta},\,$$

The information entropy is

$$\begin{align}
\operatorname{H}(X) & = \operatorname{E}[-\ln(p(X))] \\
& = \operatorname{E}\left[-\alpha \ln(\beta) + \ln(\Gamma(\alpha)) + (\alpha+1)\ln(X) + \frac{\beta}{X}\right] \\
& = -\alpha \ln(\beta) + \ln(\Gamma(\alpha)) + (\alpha+1)\ln(\beta) - (\alpha+1)\psi(\alpha) + \alpha\\
& = \alpha + \ln(\beta\Gamma(\alpha)) - (\alpha+1)\psi(\alpha).
\end{align}$$

where $\psi(\alpha)$ is the digamma function.

The Kullback-Leibler divergence of Inverse-Gamma(α_{p}, β_{p}) from Inverse-Gamma(α_{q}, β_{q}) is the same as the KL-divergence of Gamma(α_{p}, β_{p}) from Gamma(α_{q}, β_{q}):

$D_{\mathrm{KL}}(\alpha_p,\beta_p; \alpha_q, \beta_q) = \mathbb{E}\left[ \log \frac{\rho(X)}{\pi(X)}\right] = \mathbb{E}\left[ \log \frac{\rho(1/Y)}{\pi(1/Y)}\right] = \mathbb{E}\left[ \log \frac{\rho_G(Y)}{\pi_G(Y)}\right],$

where $\rho, \pi$ are the pdfs of the Inverse-Gamma distributions and $\rho_G, \pi_G$ are the pdfs of the Gamma distributions, $Y$ is Gamma(α_{p}, β_{p}) distributed.

$$\begin{align}
D_{\mathrm{KL}}(\alpha_p,\beta_p; \alpha_q, \beta_q) = {} & (\alpha_p-\alpha_q) \psi(\alpha_p) - \log\Gamma(\alpha_p) + \log\Gamma(\alpha_q) + \alpha_q(\log \beta_p - \log \beta_q) + \alpha_p\frac{\beta_q-\beta_p}{\beta_p}.
\end{align}$$

== Related distributions ==
- If $X \sim \mbox{Inv-Gamma}(\alpha, \beta)$ then $k X \sim \mbox{Inv-Gamma}(\alpha, k \beta) \,$, for $k > 0$
- If $X \sim \mbox{Inv-Gamma}(\alpha, \tfrac{1}{2})$ then $X \sim \mbox{Inv-}\chi^2(2 \alpha)\,$ (inverse-chi-squared distribution)
- If $X \sim \mbox{Inv-Gamma}(\tfrac{\alpha}{2}, \tfrac{1}{2})$ then $X \sim \mbox{Scaled Inv-}\chi^2(\alpha,\tfrac{1}{\alpha})\,$ (scaled-inverse-chi-squared distribution)
- If $X \sim \textrm{Inv-Gamma}(\tfrac{1}{2},\tfrac{c}{2})$ then $X \sim \textrm{Levy}(0,c)\,$ (Lévy distribution)
- If $X \sim \textrm{Inv-Gamma}(1,c)$ then $\tfrac{1}{X} \sim \textrm{Exp}(c)\,$ (Exponential distribution)
- If $X \sim \mbox{Gamma}(\alpha, \beta)\,$ (Gamma distribution with rate parameter $\beta$) then $\tfrac{1}{X} \sim \mbox{Inv-Gamma}(\alpha, \beta)\,$ (see derivation in the next paragraph for details)
- Note that If $X \sim \mbox{Gamma}(k, \theta)$ (Gamma distribution with scale parameter $\theta$ ) then $1/X \sim \mbox{Inv-Gamma}(k, 1/\theta)$
- Inverse gamma distribution is a special case of type 5 Pearson distribution
- A multivariate generalization of the inverse-gamma distribution is the inverse-Wishart distribution.
- For the distribution of a sum of independent inverted Gamma variables see Witkovsky (2001)

== Derivation from Gamma distribution ==
Let $X \sim \mbox{Gamma}(\alpha, \beta)$, and recall that the pdf of the gamma distribution is

$f_{X}(x) = \frac{\beta^\alpha}{\Gamma(\alpha)}x^{\alpha-1}e^{-\beta x}$, $x > 0$.

Note that $\beta$ is the rate parameter from the perspective of the gamma distribution.

Define the transformation $Y = g(X) = \tfrac{1}{X}$. Then, the pdf of $Y$ is

$$\begin{align}
f_Y(y) &= f_X \left( g^{-1}(y) \right) \left| \frac{d}{dy} g^{-1}(y) \right| \\[6pt]
&= \frac{\beta^\alpha}{\Gamma(\alpha)} \left( \frac{1}{y} \right)^{\alpha-1} \exp \left(  \frac{-\beta}{y}  \right)  \frac{1}{y^2} \\[6pt]
&= \frac{\beta^\alpha}{\Gamma(\alpha)} \left( \frac{1}{y} \right)^{\alpha+1} \exp \left(  \frac{-\beta}{y}  \right)   \\[6pt]
&= \frac{\beta^\alpha}{\Gamma(\alpha)} y^{-\alpha-1} \exp \left(  \frac{-\beta}{y}  \right) \\[6pt]
\end{align}$$

Note that ${\beta}$ is the scale parameter from the perspective of the inverse gamma distribution. This can be straightforwardly demonstrated by seeing that ${\beta}$ satisfies the conditions for being a scale parameter.

$$\begin{align}
\frac{f(y / \beta; \alpha, 1)}{\beta}  &= \frac{1}{\beta} \frac{1}{\Gamma(\alpha)} \left( \frac{y}{\beta} \right)^{-\alpha-1} \exp \left(-\frac{1}{y / \beta}\right) \\[6pt]
&= \frac{\beta^\alpha}{\Gamma(\alpha)} y^{-\alpha-1} \exp \left(-\frac{\beta}{y}\right) \\[6pt]
&= f(y; \alpha, \beta)
\end{align}$$

== Occurrence ==
- Hitting time distribution of a Wiener process follows a Lévy distribution, which is a special case of the inverse-gamma distribution with $\alpha=0.5$.

== See also ==
- Gamma distribution
- Inverse-chi-squared distribution
- Normal distribution
- Pearson distribution
