= Pearson distribution =

Family of continuous probability distributions

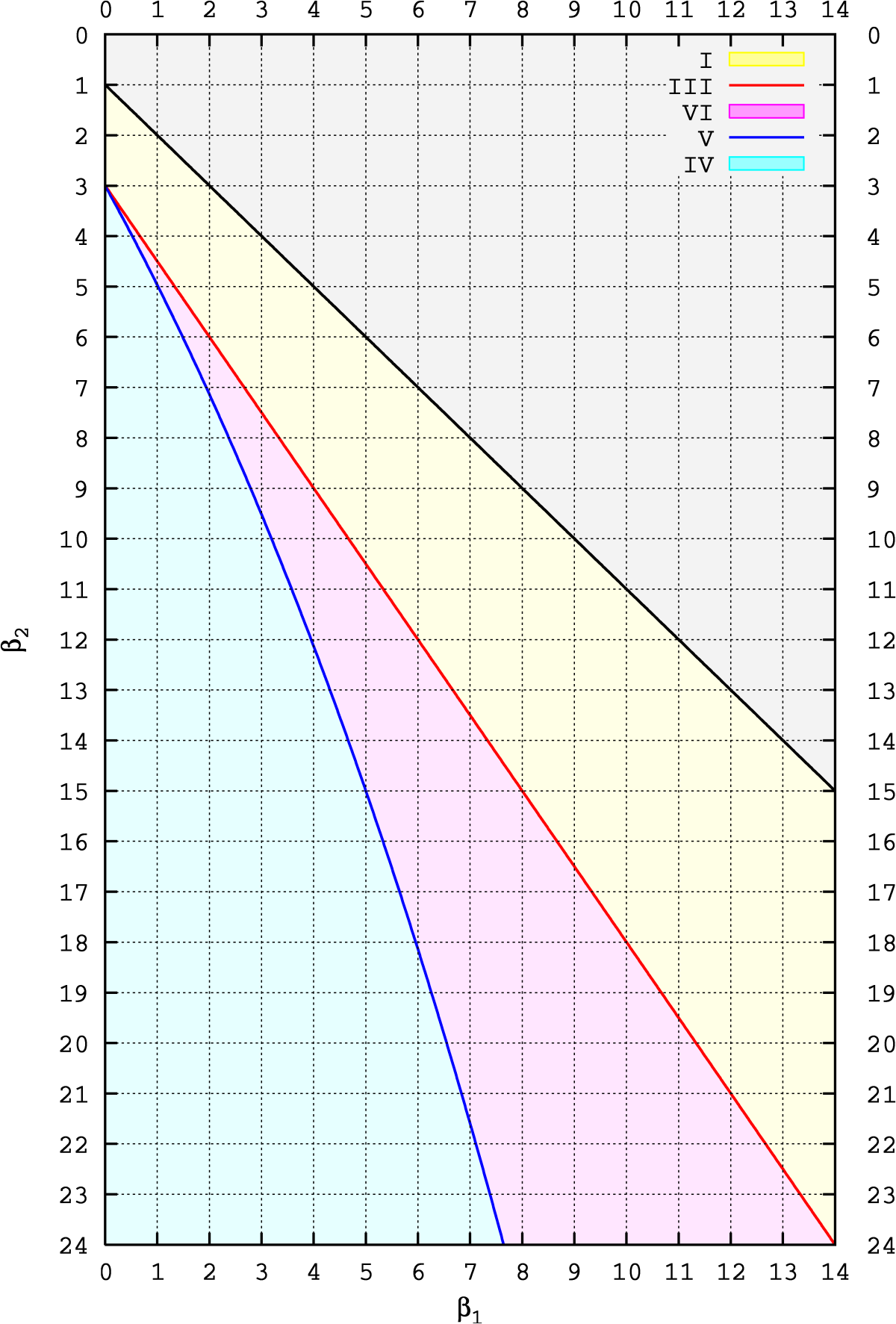
Diagram of the Pearson system, showing distributions of types I, III, VI, V, and IV in terms of β_{1} (squared skewness) and β_{2} (traditional kurtosis)

The Pearson distribution is a family of continuous probability distributions. It was first published by Karl Pearson in 1895 and subsequently extended by him in 1901 and 1916 in a series of articles on biostatistics.

== History ==
The Pearson system was originally devised in an effort to model visibly skewed observations. It was well known at the time how to adjust a theoretical model to fit the first two cumulants or moments of observed data: any probability distribution can be extended straightforwardly to form a location-scale family. Except in pathological cases, a location-scale family can be made to fit the observed mean (first cumulant) and variance (second cumulant) arbitrarily well. However, it was not known how to construct probability distributions in which the skewness (standardized third cumulant) and kurtosis (standardized fourth cumulant) could be adjusted equally freely. This need became apparent when trying to fit known theoretical models to observed data that exhibited skewness. Pearson's examples include survival data, which are usually asymmetric.

In his original paper, Pearson (1895, p. 360) identified four types of distributions (numbered I through IV) in addition to the normal distribution (which was originally known as type V). The classification depended on whether the distributions were supported on a bounded interval, on a half-line, or on the whole real line; and whether they were potentially skewed or necessarily symmetric. A second paper (Pearson 1901) fixed two omissions: it redefined the type V distribution (originally just the normal distribution, but now the inverse-gamma distribution) and introduced the type VI distribution. Together the first two papers cover the five main types of the Pearson system (I, III, IV, V, and VI). In a third paper, Pearson (1916) introduced further special cases and subtypes (VII through XII).

Rhind (1909, pp. 430–432) devised a simple way of visualizing the parameter space of the Pearson system, which was subsequently adopted by Pearson (1916, plate 1 and pp. 430ff., 448ff.). The Pearson types are characterized by two quantities, commonly referred to as β_{1} and β_{2}. The first is the square of the skewness: β_{1} = γ_{1}^{2} where γ_{1} is the skewness, or third standardized moment. The second is the traditional kurtosis, or fourth standardized moment: β_{2} = γ_{2} + 3. (Modern treatments define kurtosis γ_{2} in terms of cumulants instead of moments, so that for a normal distribution we have γ_{2} = 0 and β_{2} = 3. Here we follow the historical precedent and use β_{2}.) The diagram shows which Pearson type a given concrete distribution (identified by a point (β_{1}, β_{2})) belongs to.

Many of the skewed or non-mesokurtic distributions familiar to statisticians today were still unknown in the early 1890s. What is now known as the beta distribution had been used by Thomas Bayes as a posterior distribution of the parameter of a Bernoulli distribution in his 1763 work on inverse probability. The beta distribution gained prominence due to its membership in Pearson's system and was known until the 1940s as the Pearson type I distribution. (Pearson's type II distribution is a special case of type I, but is usually no longer singled out.) The gamma distribution originated from Pearson's work (Pearson 1893, p. 331; Pearson 1895, pp. 357, 360, 373–376) and was known as the Pearson type III distribution, before acquiring its modern name in the 1930s and 1940s. Pearson's 1895 paper introduced the type IV distribution, which contains Student's t-distribution as a special case, predating William Sealy Gosset's subsequent use by several years. His 1901 paper introduced the inverse-gamma distribution (type V) and the beta prime distribution (type VI).

== Definition ==
A Pearson density p is defined to be any valid solution to the differential equation (cf. Pearson 1902, p. 277)

$$\frac{p'(x)}{p(x)} + \frac{A(x)}{B(x)} = 0 \qquad (1)$$

where:

- A(x) = a_{1} + a_{2}x is a polynomial of degree at most 1,
- B(x) = b_{0} + b_{1}x + b_{2}x^{2} with B ≠ 0 is a non-zero polynomial of degree at most 2,
- (a_{2}, b_{2}) ≠ (0, 0):
  - if (a_{2}, b_{2}) = (0, 0) but (a_{1}, b_{1}) ≠ (0, 0), multiply A and B by x+u with arbitrary finite u ≠ b_{0}/b_{1},
  - if (a_{2}, b_{2}) = (0, 0) and (a_{1}, b_{1}) = (0, 0) (hence A = 0), multiply A and B by (x+u)(x+v) with arbitrary finite u and v satisfying u ≠ v,
- the domain I of p is an open interval (x_{min}, x_{max}) bounded by infinities and/or real zeros of B but not containing any of them, i.e.:
  - if B has no real zeros, then $I = \R$,
  - if B has one real zero x_{0}, then I = (−∞, x_{0}) or I = (x_{0}, +∞),
  - if B has two real zeros x_{−} < x_{+}, then I = (−∞, x_{−}) or I = (x_{−}, x_{+}) or I = (x_{+}, +∞).

It's why, for instance, the half-normal and truncated normal distributions are not Pearson distributions (their domain doesn't match the above criteria) even though they satisfy equation (1).

Dimensional analysis shows that coefficients a_{k} and b_{k} have dimension [AX^{−k}], with [A] an arbitrary dimension and [X] the dimension of x, hence the shift in the indices of a_{k}.

If the distribution has moments up to order at least 4, with mean μ and standard deviation σ, we have (cf. Pearson 1916, p. 437, and Carver 1924, pp. 103–104)

$$\frac{p'(x)}{p(x)} + \frac{1}{\sigma} \frac{c_1 + c_2 \frac{x-\mu}{\sigma}}{d_0 + d_1 \frac{x-\mu}{\sigma} + d_2 \left( \frac{x-\mu}{\sigma} \right)^2} = 0$$

with

$$\begin{cases}\begin{align}
c_2 &= 2 (5 \beta_2 - 6 \beta_1 - 9) \\
d_0 &= 4 \beta_2 - 3 \beta_1 \\
c_1 = d_1 &= \gamma_1 (\beta_2 + 3) \\
d_2 &= 2 \beta_2 - 3 \beta_1 - 6
\end{align}\end{cases}$$

defined up to a non-zero multiplicative constant of proportionality. Moreover, the natural dimension of coefficients a_{k} and b_{k} is then [X^{8−k}].

Proof

The proof below is an expansion of the proof sketched in Carver 1924, pp. 103–104. In particular, the fact that [q(x) D(x) x^{r}]_{J} = 0 was just assumed without any justification:

[...] if the frequency function, when multiplied by t^{n}, vanishes at the limits of the distribution [...]

Let X be the distribution with density p satisfying equation (1), with mean μ, standard deviation σ, skewness γ_{1}, finite kurtosis β_{2}, and domain I = (x_{min}, x_{max}) following the aforementioned conditions regarding the zeros of B: if x_{min} (resp. x_{max}) is finite, then B(x_{min}) = 0 (resp. B(x_{max}) = 0). Let Z = (X−μ)/σ be its standardization, which thus has density q(x) = σ p(σx+μ), domain J = ((x_{min}−μ)/σ, (x_{max}−μ)/σ), and its raw moments have the same numerical values (but not the same dimensions) as the standardized moments of X: ∫_{J} x^{r} q(x) dx = α_{r}, with α_{0} = 1, α_{1} = 0, α_{2} = 1, α_{3} = γ_{1}, and α_{4} = β_{2}.

The density of Z satisfies

$$\frac{q'(x)}{q(x)} = \frac{\sigma^2 p'(\sigma x + \mu)}{\sigma p(\sigma x + \mu)} = - \sigma \frac{A(\sigma x + \mu)}{B(\sigma x + \mu)}$$

which has the same linear-divided-by-quadratic structure as equation (1). We can thus set

$$\frac{q'(x)}{q(x)} + \frac{C(x)}{D(x)} = 0 \qquad (1')$$

with C(x) = c_{1} + c_{2}x and D(x) = d_{0} + d_{1}x + d_{2}x^{2}. As D(x) is proportional to B(σx+μ), the finite boundaries of the domain J are zeros of D.

Conversely, as p(x) = σ^{−1} q((x−μ)/σ), we get

$$\frac{p'(x)}{p(x)} = \frac{\sigma^{-2} q'\left( \frac{x - \mu}{\sigma} \right)}{\sigma^{-1} q\left( \frac{x - \mu}{\sigma} \right)} = - \frac{1}{\sigma} \frac{C\left( \frac{x - \mu}{\sigma} \right)}{D\left( \frac{x - \mu}{\sigma} \right)},$$

hence

$$\frac{p'(x)}{p(x)} + \frac{1}{\sigma} \frac{c_1 + c_2 \frac{x-\mu}{\sigma}}{d_0 + d_1 \frac{x-\mu}{\sigma} + d_2 \left( \frac{x-\mu}{\sigma} \right)^2} = 0$$

with coefficients c_{k} and d_{k} to be determined.

Given a natural number r ∈ ⟦0, 3⟧, we then multiply each term of equation (1') by q(x) D(x) x^{r}, yielding

$$q'(x) D(x) x^r + q(x) (c_1 x^r + c_2 x^{r+1}) = 0.$$

Integrating the two terms of the equation over J, and integrating by parts the first addend, we obtain

$$\begin{align}
0 &= \int_J 0 \,dx \\
&= \Big[ q(x) D(x) x^r \Big]_J - \int_J q(x) [D(x) x^r]' \,dx + \int_J q(x) (c_1 x^r + c_2 x^{r+1}) \,dx \\
&= \Big[ q(x) D(x) x^r \Big]_J + \int_J q(x) [c_1 x^r + c_2 x^{r+1} - r d_0 x^{r-1} - (r+1) d_1 x^r - (r+2) d_2 x^{r+1}] \,dx \\
&= \Big[ q(x) D(x) x^r \Big]_J + c_1 \alpha_r + c_2 \alpha_{r+1} - r d_0 \alpha_{r-1} - (r+1) d_1 \alpha_r - (r+2) d_2 \alpha_{r+1}.
\end{align}$$

Let t be a boundary, finite or infinite, of the domain J:

- if t is finite:
  - the convergence of ∫_{J} q(x) dx = 1 means that we have q(x) = o((x−t)^{−1}) as x → t, hence q(x) (x−t) = 0,
  - t is a zero of the quadratic polynomial D so D(x)/(x−t) is a linear polynomial taking a finite value at t,
  - t^{r} is finite,
  - thus q(x) D(x) x^{r} = 0;
- if t is infinite:
  - the existence of the kurtosis of X, and thus of Z, means that we have x^{η} q(x) = o(x^{−1}) for at least η ≤ 4 as x → t, hence q(x) x^{n} = 0 for at least n ≤ 5,
  - D(x) x^{r} is a polynomial of degree at most r+2 ≤ 5,
  - thus q(x) D(x) x^{r} = 0.

Consequently, we always have [q(x) D(x) x^{r}]_{J} = 0.

Letting r take all values in ⟦0, 3⟧, we thus obtain a system of 4 linear equations:

$$\begin{cases}\begin{alignat}{3}
0 &= c_1 \alpha_0 + c_2 \alpha_1 - 0 d_0 \alpha_{-1} - 1 d_1 \alpha_0 - 2 d_2 \alpha_1 &&= c_1 - d_1 \\
0 &= c_1 \alpha_1 + c_2 \alpha_2 - 1 d_0 \alpha_0    - 2 d_1 \alpha_1 - 3 d_2 \alpha_2 &&= c_2 - d_0 - 3 d_2 \\
0 &= c_1 \alpha_2 + c_2 \alpha_3 - 2 d_0 \alpha_1    - 3 d_1 \alpha_2 - 4 d_2 \alpha_3 &&= c_1 + \gamma_1 c_2 - 3 d_1 - 4 \gamma_1 d_2 \\
0 &= c_1 \alpha_3 + c_2 \alpha_4 - 3 d_0 \alpha_2    - 4 d_1 \alpha_3 - 5 d_2 \alpha_4 &&= \gamma_1 c_1 + \beta_2 c_2 - 3 d_0 - 4 \gamma_1 d_1 - 5 \beta_2 d_2.
\end{alignat}\end{cases}$$

We thus have c_{1} = d_{1} and c_{2} = d_{0} + 3 d_{2}, yielding

$$\begin{cases}\begin{alignat}{3}
0 &= d_1 + \gamma_1 (d_0 + 3 d_2) - 3 d_1 - 4 \gamma_1 d_2                        &&= \gamma_1 d_0 - 2 d_1 - \gamma_1 d_2 \\
0 &= \gamma_1 d_1 + \beta_2 (d_0 + 3 d_2) - 3 d_0 - 4 \gamma_1 d_1 - 5 \beta_2 d_2 &&= (\beta_2 - 3) d_0 - 3 \gamma_1 d_1 - 2 \beta_2 d_2.
\end{alignat}\end{cases}$$

Then d_{1} = (γ_{1} (d_{0} − d_{2}))/2, thus

$$\begin{align}
0 &= 2 \beta_2 d_0 - 6 d_0 - 3 \gamma_1^2 (d_0 - d_2) - 4 \beta_2 d_2 \\
&= (2 \beta_2 - 6 - 3 \gamma_1^2) d_0 + (3 \gamma_1^2 - 4 \beta_2) d_2 \\
&= (2 \beta_2 - 3 \beta_1 - 6) d_0 - (4 \beta_2 - 3 \beta_1) d_2.
\end{align}$$

As the coefficients c_{k} and d_{k} can be all multiplied by a non-zero constant without changing equation (1'), we can then freely set

$$\begin{cases}\begin{align}
d_0 &= 4 \beta_2 - 3 \beta_1 \\
d_2 &= 2 \beta_2 - 3 \beta_1 - 6
\end{align}\end{cases}$$

resulting in

$$\begin{cases}\begin{alignat}{3}
c_2 &= d_0 + 3 d_2            &&= 2 (5 \beta_2 - 6 \beta_1 - 9) \\
c_1 = d_1 &= \gamma_1 (d_0 - d_2)/2 &&= \gamma_1 (\beta_2 + 3).
\end{alignat}\end{cases}$$

By expanding γ_{1} = α_{3} = μ_{3}σ^{−3} and β_{2} = α_{4} = μ_{4}σ^{−4}, and using μ_{2} = σ^{2}, we get

$$\begin{cases}\begin{alignat}{3}
c_2 &= 2 (5 \mu_4 \sigma^{-4} - 6 \mu_3^2 \sigma^{-6} - 9) &&= 2 \sigma^{-6} (5 \mu_4 \mu_2 - 6 \mu_3^2 - 9 \mu_2^3) \\
d_0 &= 4 \mu_4 \sigma^{-4} - 3 \mu_3^2 \sigma^{-6}         &&= \sigma^{-6} (\mu_4 \mu_2 - 3 \mu_3^2) \\
c_1 = d_1 &= \mu_3 \sigma^{-3} (\mu_4 \sigma^{-4} + 3)           &&= \sigma^{-7} \mu_3 (\mu_4 + 3 \mu_2^2) \\
d_2 &= 2 \mu_4 \sigma^{-4} - 3 \mu_3^2 \sigma^{-6} - 6     &&= \sigma^{-6} (2 \mu_4 \mu_2 - 3 \mu_3^2 - 6 \mu_2^3)
\end{alignat}\end{cases}$$

and thus

$$\begin{align}
\frac{a_1 + a_2 x}{b_0 + b_1 x + b_2 x^2} &= \frac{1}{\sigma} \frac{c_1 + c_2 \frac{x-\mu}{\sigma}}{d_0 + d_1 \frac{x-\mu}{\sigma} + d_2 \left( \frac{x-\mu}{\sigma} \right)^2} \\
&= \frac{\sigma^{-7} \mu_3 (\mu_4 + 3 \mu_2^2) + 2 \sigma^{-7} (5 \mu_4 \mu_2 - 6 \mu_3^2 - 9 \mu_2^3) (x - \mu)}{\sigma^{-5} (\mu_4 \mu_2 - 3 \mu_3^2) + \sigma^{-7} \mu_3 (\mu_4 + 3 \mu_2^2) (x - \mu) + \sigma^{-7} (2 \mu_4 \mu_2 - 3 \mu_3^2 - 6 \mu_2^3) (x - \mu)^2} \\
&= \frac{\mu_3 (\mu_4 + 3 \mu_2^2) + 2 (5 \mu_4 \mu_2 - 6 \mu_3^2 - 9 \mu_2^3) (x - \mu)}{\mu_2 (\mu_4 \mu_2 - 3 \mu_3^2) + \mu_3 (\mu_4 + 3 \mu_2^2) (x - \mu) + (2 \mu_4 \mu_2 - 3 \mu_3^2 - 6 \mu_2^3) (x - \mu)^2}.
\end{align}$$

As μ_{k} has dimension [X^{k}] (and μ has dimension [X]), we see that removing the σs appearing in denominators yields coefficients a_{k} and b_{k} with dimension [X^{8−k}].

By setting ξ_{4} = β_{2} + 3 and ξ_{6} = 3β_{2} − 3β_{1} − 3, we obtain expressions without additive constants as we have:

$$\begin{cases}\begin{align}
c_2 &= 2 (2 \xi_6 - \xi_4) \\
d_0 &= \xi_6 + \xi_4 \\
c_1 = d_1 &= \gamma_1 \xi_4 \\
d_2 &= \xi_6 - \xi_4.
\end{align}\end{cases}$$

According to Ord, Pearson devised the underlying form of equation (1) on the basis of, firstly, the formula for the derivative of the logarithm of the density function of the normal distribution (which gives a linear function) and, secondly, from a recurrence relation for values in the probability mass function of the hypergeometric distribution (which yields the linear-divided-by-quadratic structure).

In equation (1), the parameters a_{1} and a_{2} determine a stationary point if a_{2} ≠ 0, and hence under some conditions a mode of the distribution, since

$$p'\left( -\frac{a_1}{a_2} \right) = 0$$

follows directly from the differential equation.

Since we are confronted with a first-order linear differential equation with variable coefficients, its solution is straightforward:

$$p(x) \propto \exp\left( -\int \frac{a_2 x + a_1}{b_2 x^2 + b_1 x + b_0} \,dx \right).$$

The integral in this solution simplifies considerably when certain special cases of the integrand are considered. Pearson (1895, p. 367) distinguished two main cases, determined by the sign of the discriminant (and hence the number of real roots) of the quadratic function

$$B(x) = b_2 x^2 + b_1 x + b_0. \qquad (2)$$

== Particular types of distribution ==
=== Case 1, negative discriminant ===
==== The Pearson type IV distribution ====
If the discriminant of the quadratic function (2) is negative ($b_1^2 - 4 b_2 b_0 < 0$), it has no real roots. Then define

$$\begin{align}
y &= x + \frac{b_1}{2b_2}, \\[5pt]
\alpha &= \frac{\sqrt{4b_2b_0 - b_1^2}}{2b_2}.
\end{align}$$

Observe that α is a well-defined real number and α ≠ 0, because by assumption $4 b_2 b_0 - b_1^2 > 0$ and therefore b_{2} ≠ 0. Applying these substitutions, the quadratic function (2) is transformed into

$$B(x) = b_2(y^2 + \alpha^2).$$

The absence of real roots is obvious from this formulation, because α^{2} is necessarily positive.

We now express the solution to the differential equation (1) as a function of y:

$$p(y) \propto \exp\left(- \frac{1}{b_2} \int\frac{y - \frac{b_1}{2b_2} + a}{y^2 + \alpha^2} \,dy  \right).$$

Pearson (1895, p. 362) called this the "trigonometrical case", because the integral

$$\int\frac{y-\frac{2b_2a - b_1}{2b_2}}{y^2 + \alpha^2} \,dy = \frac{1}{2} \ln(y^2 + \alpha^2) - \frac{2b_2a - b_1}{2b_2\alpha}\arctan\left(\frac{y}{\alpha}\right) + C_0$$

involves the inverse trigonometric arctan function. Then

$$p(y) \propto \exp\left[ -\frac{1}{2b_2} \ln\left(1+\frac{y^2}{\alpha^2}\right) -\frac{\ln\alpha}{b_2} +\frac{2b_2a - b_1}{2b_2^2\alpha} \arctan\left(\frac{y}{\alpha}\right) + C_1 \right].$$

Finally, let

$$\begin{align}
m &= \frac{1}{2b_2}, \\[5pt]
\nu &= -\frac{2b_2a - b_1}{2b_2^2\alpha}.
\end{align}$$

Applying these substitutions, we obtain the parametric function:

$$p(y) \propto  \left[1 + \frac{y^2}{\alpha^2}\right]^{-m} \exp\left[-\nu \arctan\left(\frac{y}{\alpha}\right) \right].$$

This unnormalized density has support on the entire real line. It depends on a scale parameter α > 0 and shape parameters m > 1/2 and ν. One parameter was lost when we chose to find the solution to the differential equation (1) as a function of y rather than x. We therefore reintroduce a fourth parameter, namely the location parameter λ. We have thus derived the density of the Pearson type IV distribution:

$$p(x) = \frac{\left|\frac{\operatorname{\Gamma}\left(m+\frac{\nu}{2}i\right)}{\Gamma(m)}\right|^2}{\alpha\operatorname{\Beta}\left(m-\frac12, \frac12\right)}
\left[1 + \left(\frac{x-\lambda}{\alpha}\right)^2 \right]^{-m} \exp\left[-\nu \arctan\left(\frac{x-\lambda} \alpha \right)\right].$$

The normalizing constant involves the complex Gamma function (Γ) and the Beta function (B). Notice that the location parameter λ here is not the same as the original location parameter introduced in the general formulation, but is related via

$$\lambda = \lambda_{original} + \frac{\alpha \nu}{2(m-1)}.$$

==== The Pearson type VII distribution ====
Plot of Pearson type VII densities with λ = 0, σ = 1, and: γ_{2} = ∞ (red); γ_{2} = 4 (blue); and γ_{2} = 0 (black)

The shape parameter ν of the Pearson type IV distribution controls its skewness. If we fix its value at zero, we obtain a symmetric three-parameter family. This special case is known as the Pearson type VII distribution (cf. Pearson 1916, p. 450). Its density is

$$p(x) = \frac{1}{\alpha\operatorname{\Beta}\left(m-\frac12, \frac12\right)} \left[1 + \left(\frac{x-\lambda} \alpha \right)^2 \right]^{-m},$$

where B is the Beta function.

An alternative parameterization (and slight specialization) of the type VII distribution is obtained by letting

$$\alpha = \sigma\sqrt{2m-3},$$

which requires m > 3/2. This entails a minor loss of generality but ensures that the variance of the distribution exists and is equal to σ^{2}. Now the parameter m only controls the kurtosis of the distribution. If m approaches infinity as λ and σ are held constant, the normal distribution arises as a special case:

$$\begin{align}
&\lim_{m\to\infty}\frac{1}{\sigma\sqrt{2m-3}\,\operatorname{\Beta}\left(m-\frac12, \frac12\right)} \left[1 + \left(\frac{x-\lambda}{\sigma\sqrt{2m-3}}\right)^2 \right]^{-m} \\[5pt]
= {} & \frac{1}{\sigma\sqrt{2}\,\operatorname{\Gamma}\left(\frac12\right)} \cdot \lim_{m\to\infty} \frac{\Gamma(m)}{\operatorname{\Gamma}\left(m-\frac12\right) \sqrt{m-\frac32}} \cdot \lim_{m\to\infty} \left[1 + \frac{\left(\frac{x-\lambda}{\sigma}\right)^2}{2m-3} \right]^{-m} \\[5pt]
= {} & \frac{1}{\sigma\sqrt{2\pi}} \cdot 1 \cdot \exp\left[-\frac12 \left(\frac{x-\lambda}{\sigma}\right)^2 \right].
\end{align}$$

This is the density of a normal distribution with mean λ and standard deviation σ.

It is convenient to require that m > 5/2 and to let

$$m = \frac52 + \frac{3}{\gamma_2}.$$

This is another specialization, and it guarantees that the first four moments of the distribution exist. More specifically, the Pearson type VII distribution parameterized in terms of (λ, σ, γ_{2}) has a mean of λ, standard deviation of σ, skewness of zero, and positive excess kurtosis of γ_{2}.

==== Student's t-distribution ====
The Pearson type VII distribution is equivalent to the non-standardized Student's t-distribution with parameters ν > 0, μ, σ^{2} by applying the following substitutions to its original parameterization:

$$\begin{align}
\lambda &= \mu, \\[5pt]
\alpha &= \sqrt{\nu\sigma^2}, \\[5pt]
m &= \frac{\nu+1}{2},
\end{align}$$

Observe that the constraint m > 1/2 is satisfied.

The resulting density is

$$p(x\mid\mu,\sigma^2,\nu) = \frac{1}{\sqrt{\nu\sigma^2}\,\operatorname{\Beta}\left(\frac{\nu}{2}, \frac12\right)} \left(1+\frac{1}{\nu}\frac{(x-\mu)^2}{\sigma^2}\right)^{-\frac{\nu+1}{2}},$$

which is easily recognized as the density of a Student's t-distribution.

This implies that the Pearson type VII distribution subsumes the standard Student's t-distribution and also the standard Cauchy distribution. In particular, the standard Student's t-distribution arises as a subcase, when μ = 0 and σ^{2} = 1, equivalent to the following substitutions:

$$\begin{align}
\lambda &= 0, \\[5pt]
\alpha &= \sqrt{\nu}, \\[5pt]
m &= \frac{\nu+1}{2},
\end{align}$$

The density of this restricted one-parameter family is a standard Student's t:

$$p(x) = \frac{1}{\sqrt{\nu}\,\operatorname{\Beta}\left(\frac{\nu}{2}, \frac12\right)} \left(1 + \frac{x^2}{\nu} \right)^{-\frac{\nu+1}{2}},$$

=== Case 2, non-negative discriminant ===
If the quadratic function (2) has a non-negative discriminant ($b_1^2 - 4 b_2 b_0 \geq 0$), it has real roots a_{1} and a_{2} (not necessarily distinct):

$$\begin{align}
a_1 &= \frac{-b_1 - \sqrt{b_1^2 - 4 b_2 b_0}}{2 b_2}, \\[5pt]
a_2 &= \frac{-b_1 + \sqrt{b_1^2 - 4 b_2 b_0}}{2 b_2}.
\end{align}$$

In the presence of real roots the quadratic function (2) can be written as

$$B(x) = b_2(x-a_1)(x-a_2),$$

and the solution to the differential equation is therefore

$$p(x) \propto \exp\left( -\frac{1}{b_2} \int\frac{x-a}{(x - a_1) (x - a_2)} \,dx \right).$$

Pearson (1895, p. 362) called this the "logarithmic case", because the integral

$$\int\frac{x-a}{(x - a_1) (x - a_2)} \,dx = \frac{(a_1-a)\ln(x-a_1) - (a_2-a)\ln(x-a_2)}{a_1-a_2} + C$$

involves only the logarithm function and not the arctan function as in the previous case.

Using the substitution

$$\nu = \frac{1}{b_2(a_1-a_2)},$$

we obtain the following solution to the differential equation (1):

$$p(x) \propto (x-a_1)^{-\nu (a_1-a)} (x-a_2)^{\nu (a_2-a)}.$$

Since this density is only known up to a hidden constant of proportionality, that constant can be changed and the density written as follows:

$$p(x) \propto \left(1-\frac{x}{a_1}\right)^{-\nu (a_1-a)} \left(1-\frac{x}{a_2}\right)^{ \nu (a_2-a)}.$$

==== The Pearson type I distribution ====
The Pearson type I distribution (a generalization of the beta distribution to more general finite region of support) arises when the roots of the quadratic equation (2) are of opposite sign, that is, $a_1 < 0 < a_2$. Then the solution p is supported on the interval $(a_1, a_2)$. Apply the substitution

$$x = a_1 + y (a_2 - a_1),$$

where $0<y<1$, which yields a solution in terms of y that is supported on the interval (0, 1):

$$p(y) \propto \left(\frac{a_1-a_2}{a_1}y\right)^{(-a_1+a)\nu} \left(\frac{a_2-a_1}{a_2}(1-y)\right)^{(a_2-a)\nu}.$$

One may define:

$$\begin{align}
m_1 &= \frac{a-a_1}{b_2 (a_1-a_2)}, \\[5pt]
m_2 &= \frac{a-a_2}{b_2 (a_2-a_1)}.
\end{align}$$

Regrouping constants and parameters, this simplifies to

$$p(y) \propto y^{m_1} (1-y)^{m_2},$$

Thus $\frac{x-\lambda-a_1}{a_2-a_1}$ follows a beta distribution $\Beta(m_1+1,m_2+1)$ with $\lambda=\mu_1-(a_2-a_1) \frac{m_1+1}{m_1+m_2+2}-a_1$. It turns out that m_{1}, m_{2} > −1 is necessary and sufficient for p to be a proper probability density function.

==== The Pearson type II distribution ====
The Pearson type II distribution is a special case of the Pearson type I family restricted to symmetric distributions. Using formulae from the type I section, with $m_1 = m_2 = m$ and $-a_1 = a_2 = a$, on the interval (−a, a) it can be written as:

$$p(x)   \propto  \left(1-\frac{x^2}{a^2}\right)^m.$$

Or with

$$x = -a + 2 y a,$$

$y$ is distributed according to the beta distribution on the interval (0, 1),

$$p(y) \propto    \left(1 - 4 \left(y - \frac 1 2\right)^2\right)^m    \propto y^{m} (1 - y)^{m}.$$

with appropriate constant of proportionality the PDF becomes

$$p(y) = y^{m} (1-y)^{m} \frac{\Gamma(2m+2)}{\Gamma(m+1)^2}.$$

==== The Pearson type III distribution ====
Defining

$$\lambda= \mu_1 + \frac{b_0}{b_1} - (m+1) b_1,$$

$b_0+b_1 (x-\lambda)$ is $\operatorname{Gamma}(m+1,b_1^2)$. The Pearson type III distribution is a gamma distribution or chi-squared distribution.

==== The Pearson type V distribution ====
Defining new parameters:

$$\begin{align}
C_1 &= \frac{b_1}{2 b_2}, \\
\lambda &= \mu_1-\frac{a-C_1} {1-2 b_2},
\end{align}$$

$x-\lambda$ follows an $\operatorname{InverseGamma}(\frac{1}{b_2}-1,\frac{a-C_1}{b_2})$. The Pearson type V distribution is an inverse-gamma distribution.

==== The Pearson type VI distribution ====
Defining

$$\lambda=\mu_1 + (a_2-a_1) \frac{m_2+1}{m_2+m_1+2} - a_2,$$

$\frac{x-\lambda-a_2}{a_2-a_1}$ follows a $\beta^{\prime}(m_2+1,-m_2-m_1-1)$. The Pearson type VI distribution is a beta prime distribution or F-distribution.

== Relation to other distributions ==
The Pearson family subsumes the following distributions, among others:

- Bernoulli distribution (B; limit of I)
- Beta distribution (I and its symmetric subtype II)
- Beta prime distribution (VI)
- Cauchy distribution (subtype of VII)
- Chi-squared distribution (subtype of III)
- Continuous uniform distribution (R; subtype of II, VIII, IX, and XII)
- Exponential distribution (X/E; subtype of III, limit of IX and XI)
- Gamma distribution (III; limit of I and VI)
- Generalized Pareto distribution (VIII, IX, X/E, and XI)
- F-distribution (subtype of VI)
- Inverse-chi-squared distribution (subtype of V)
- Inverse-gamma distribution (V; limit of IV and VI)
- Normal distribution (G; limit of II (and thus I), III, VII (and thus IV), V, and VI)
- Pareto distribution (XI; subtype of VI)
- Power function distribution (VIII and IX; subtype of I)
- Student's t-distribution (VII; symmetric subtype of IV)
- Wigner semicircle distribution (subtype of II)

As of 2025, the only types without a name are IV (see above) and XII (beta distribution with $\alpha + \beta = 2$).

Alternatives to the Pearson system of distributions for the purpose of fitting distributions to data are the quantile-parameterized distributions (QPDs) and the metalog distributions. QPDs and metalogs can provide greater shape and bounds flexibility than the Pearson system. Instead of fitting moments, QPDs are typically fit to empirical CDF or other data with linear least squares.

Examples of modern alternatives to the Pearson skewness-vs-kurtosis diagram are: (i) https://github.com/SchildCode/PearsonPlot and (ii) the "Cullen and Frey graph" in the statistical application R.

== Applications ==
These models are used in financial markets, given their ability to be parametrized in a way that has intuitive meaning for market traders. A number of models are in current use that capture the stochastic nature of the volatility of rates, stocks, etc., and this family of distributions may prove to be one of the more important.

In the United States, the log-gamma distribution (historically named Log-Pearson III) is the default distribution for flood frequency analysis.

Recently, there have been alternatives developed to the Pearson distributions that are more flexible and easier to fit to data. See the metalog distributions.

== Sources ==
=== Primary sources ===
- Pearson, Karl (1893). "Contributions to the mathematical theory of evolution [abstract]". Proceedings of the Royal Society. 54 (326–330): 329–333. doi:10.1098/rspl.1893.0079. JSTOR 115538.
- Pearson, Karl (1895). "Contributions to the mathematical theory of evolution, II: Skew variation in homogeneous material". Philosophical Transactions of the Royal Society. 186: 343–414. Bibcode:1895RSPTA.186..343P. doi:10.1098/rsta.1895.0010. JSTOR 90649.
- Pearson, Karl (1901). "Mathematical contributions to the theory of evolution, X: Supplement to a memoir on skew variation". Philosophical Transactions of the Royal Society A. 197 (287–299): 443–459. Bibcode:1901RSPTA.197..443P. doi:10.1098/rsta.1901.0023. JSTOR 90841.
- Pearson, Karl (1902). "On the methematical theory of errors of judgement, with special reference to the personal equation". Philosophical Transactions of the Royal Society A. 198 (300–311): 235–299. doi:10.1098/rsta.1902.0005.
- Pearson, Karl (1905). Mathematical contributions to the theory of evolution, XIV: On the general theory of skew correlation and non-linear regression (memoir). Drapers' Company Research Memoirs – Biometric series. Vol. II.
- Pearson, Karl (1916). "Mathematical contributions to the theory of evolution, XIX: Second supplement to a memoir on skew variation". Philosophical Transactions of the Royal Society A. 216 (538–548): 429–457. Bibcode:1916RSPTA.216..429P. doi:10.1098/rsta.1916.0009. JSTOR 91092.
- Rhind, A. (July–October 1909). "Tables to facilitate the computation of the probable errors of the chief constants of skew frequency distributions". Biometrika. 7 (1/2): 127–147. doi:10.1093/biomet/7.1-2.127. JSTOR 2345367.

=== Secondary sources ===
- Milton Abramowitz and Irene A. Stegun (1964). Handbook of Mathematical Functions with Formulas, Graphs, and Mathematical Tables. National Bureau of Standards.
- Craig, Cecil C. (March 1936). "A New Exposition and Chart for the Pearson System of Frequency Curves". Annals of Mathematical Statistics. 7 (1): 16–28. doi:10.1214/aoms/1177732542. JSTOR 2957507. Zbl 0013.35905.
- Carver, H. C. (1924). "Pearson's generalized frequency curves". In Rietz, H. L. (ed.). Handbook of Mathematical Statistics. Boston: Houghton Mifflin. pp. 103–110.
- Eric W. Weisstein et al. Pearson Type III Distribution. From MathWorld.

=== References ===
- Elderton, Sir W.P, Johnson, N.L. (1969) Systems of Frequency Curves. Cambridge University Press.
- Ord J.K. (1972) Families of Frequency Distributions. Griffin, London.
