= Vincent average =

Statistical estimation technique

In applied statistics, Vincentization was described by Ratcliff (1979), and is named after biologist S. B. Vincent (1912), who used something very similar to it for constructing learning curves at the beginning of the 1900s. It basically consists of averaging $n\geq 2$ subjects' estimated or elicited quantile functions in order to define group quantiles from which $F$ can be constructed.

To cast it in its greatest generality, let $F_1,\dots, F_n$ represent arbitrary (empirical or theoretical) distribution functions and define their corresponding quantile functions by

$$F_i^{-1}(\alpha) = \inf\{t\in \mathbb{R} : F_i(t)\ge\alpha) \},\quad 0<\alpha\leq 1.$$

The Vincent average of the $F_i$'s is then computed as

$$F^{-1}(\alpha) = \sum w_i F_i^{-1}(\alpha),\quad 0<\alpha\leq 1,\quad i = 1,\ldots,n$$

where the non-negative numbers $w_1,\dots,w_n$ have a sum of $1$.
