= Expert elicitation =

In science, engineering, and research, expert elicitation is the synthesis of opinions of authorities of a subject where there is uncertainty due to insufficient data or when such data is unattainable because of physical constraints or lack of resources. Expert elicitation is essentially a scientific consensus methodology. It is often used in the study of rare events. Expert elicitation allows for parametrization, an "educated guess", for the respective topic under study. Expert elicitation generally helps quantify uncertainty.

Expert elicitation tends to be multidisciplinary as well as interdisciplinary, with practically universal applicability, and is used in a broad range of fields. Prominent recent expert elicitation applications include climate change, modeling seismic hazard and damage, association of tornado damage to wind speed in developing the Enhanced Fujita scale, risk analysis for nuclear waste storage.

In performing expert elicitation certain factors need to be taken into consideration. The topic must be one for which there are people who have predictive expertise. Furthermore, the objective should be to obtain an experts' carefully considered judgment based on a systematic consideration of all relevant evidence. For this reason one should take care to adopt strategies designed to help the expert being interviewed to avoid overlooking relevant evidence. Additionally, vocabulary used should face intense scrutiny; qualitative uncertainty words such as "likely" and "unlikely" are not sufficient and can lead to confusion. Such words can mean very different things to different people, or to the same people in different situations.

== See also ==
- Applied science
- Bayesian probability

== Bibliography ==
- Apostolakis, G., 7 December 1990: The concept of probability in safety assessments of technological systems. Science, 250 (4986): 1359–1364. doi:10.1126/science.2255906
- Arkes, Hal R., Jeryl L. Mumpower, and Thomas R. Stewart, 24 January 1997: Combining Expert Opinions. Science, 275: 461–465. doi:10.1126/science.275.5299.461e
- Boissonnade, A., Hossain, Q., Kimbell, J., Mensing, R., and Savy, J., 2000: Development of a probabilistic tornado wind hazard model for the Continental United States, UCRL-ID-140922 Vol. I, Lawrence Livermore National Laboratory, Livermore, CA, 131pp.
- Booker, Jane M.; Meyer, Mary A. (2001), Eliciting and Analyzing Expert Judgment: A Practical Guide, Society for Industrial and Applied Mathematics
- Kerr, Richard A., 8 November 1996: Risk Assessment: A New Way to Ask the Experts: Rating Radioactive Waste Risks. Science, 274 (5289): 913–914. doi:10.1126/science.274.5289.913
- SSHAC, 1997: Recommendations for probabilistic seismic hazard analysis: guidelines on uncertainty and use of experts, NUREG/CR-6372, UCRL-ID-122160, Vol. I, Lawrence Livermore National Laboratory, Livermore, CA, 131 pp.
