= Krichevsky–Trofimov estimator =

In information theory, given an unknown stationary source π with alphabet A and a sample w from π, the Krichevsky–Trofimov (KT) estimator produces an estimate p_{i}(w) of the probability of each symbol i ∈ A. This estimator is optimal in the sense that it minimizes the worst-case regret asymptotically.

For a binary alphabet and a string w with m zeroes and n ones, the KT estimator p_{i}(w) is defined as:

$$\begin{align}
p_0(w) &= \frac{m + 1/2}{m + n + 1}, \\[5pt]
p_1(w) &= \frac{n + 1/2}{m + n + 1}.
\end{align}$$

This corresponds to the posterior mean of a Beta-Bernoulli posterior distribution with prior $1/2$. For the general case the estimate is made using a Dirichlet-Categorical distribution.

== See also ==
- Rule of succession
- Bayesian inference using conjugate priors for the categorical distribution
