= Mixed Poisson distribution =

Compound probability distribution

mixed Poisson distribution
- Notation: $\operatorname{Pois}(\lambda) \, \underset{\lambda}\wedge \, \pi(\lambda)$
- Parameters: $\lambda\in (0, \infty)$
- Support: $k \in \mathbb{N}_0$
- PMF: $\int_0^\infty \frac{\lambda^k}{k!}e^{-\lambda} \,\,\pi(\lambda)\, d\lambda$
- Mean: $\int_0^\infty \lambda \,\,\pi(\lambda)\,d\lambda$
- Variance: $\int_0^\infty (\lambda+(\lambda-\mu_\pi)^2) \,\,\pi(\lambda) \, d\lambda$
- Skewness: $\left(\mu_\pi+\sigma_\pi^2\right)^{-3/2} \,\left[\int_0^\infty \left[{\left(\lambda-\mu_\pi\right)}^3 + 3{\left(\lambda-\mu_\pi\right)}^2\right] \pi(\lambda) \, d\lambda + \mu_\pi\right]$
- MGF: $M_\pi(e^t-1)$, with $M_\pi$ the MGF of π
- CF: $M_\pi(e^{it}-1)$
- PGF: $M_\pi(z-1)$

A mixed Poisson distribution is a univariate discrete probability distribution in stochastics. It results from assuming that the conditional distribution of a random variable, given the value of the rate parameter, is a Poisson distribution, and that the rate parameter itself is considered as a random variable. Hence it is a special case of a compound probability distribution. Mixed Poisson distributions can be found in actuarial mathematics as a general approach for the distribution of the number of claims and is also examined as an epidemiological model. It should not be confused with compound Poisson distribution or compound Poisson process.

== Definition ==
A random variable X satisfies the mixed Poisson distribution with density π(λ) if it has the probability distribution

$$\operatorname{P}(X=k) = \int_0^\infty \frac{\lambda^k}{k!}e^{-\lambda} \,\,\pi(\lambda)\, d\lambda.$$

If we denote the probabilities of the Poisson distribution by q_{λ}(k), then

$$\operatorname{P}(X=k) = \int_0^\infty q_\lambda(k) \,\,\pi(\lambda)\, d\lambda.$$

== Properties ==
- The variance is always bigger than the expected value. This property is called overdispersion. This is in contrast to the Poisson distribution where mean and variance are the same.
- In practice, almost only densities of gamma distributions, logarithmic normal distributions and inverse Gaussian distributions are used as densities π(λ). If we choose the density of the gamma distribution, we get the negative binomial distribution, which explains why this is also called the Poisson gamma distribution.

In the following let $\mu_\pi=\int_0^\infty \lambda \,\,\pi(\lambda) \, d\lambda\,$ be the expected value of the density $\pi(\lambda)\,$ and $\sigma_\pi^2 = \int_0^\infty (\lambda-\mu_\pi)^2 \,\,\pi(\lambda) \, d\lambda\,$ be the variance of the density.

=== Expected value ===
The expected value of the mixed Poisson distribution is

$$\operatorname{E}(X)   = \mu_\pi.$$

=== Variance ===
For the variance one gets

$$\operatorname{Var}(X)  = \mu_\pi+\sigma_\pi^2.$$

=== Skewness ===
The skewness can be represented as

$$\operatorname{v}(X) = \Bigl(\mu_\pi+\sigma_\pi^2\Bigr)^{-3/2} \,\Biggl[\int_0^\infty(\lambda-\mu_\pi)^3\,\pi(\lambda)\,d{\lambda}+\mu_\pi\Biggr].$$

=== Characteristic function ===
The characteristic function has the form

$$\varphi_X(s)    = M_\pi(e^{is}-1).\,$$

Where $M_\pi$ is the moment generating function of the density.

=== Probability generating function ===
For the probability generating function, one obtains

$$m_X(s) = M_\pi(s-1).\,$$

=== Moment-generating function ===
The moment-generating function of the mixed Poisson distribution is

$$M_X(s) = M_\pi(e^s-1).\,$$

== Examples ==
Theorem—Compounding a Poisson distribution with rate parameter distributed according to a gamma distribution yields a negative binomial distribution.

Proof

Let $\pi(\lambda)=\frac{(\frac{p}{1-p})^r}{\Gamma(r)} \lambda^{r-1} e^{-\frac{p}{1-p}\lambda}$ be a density of a $\operatorname{\Gamma}\left(r,\frac{p}{1-p}\right)$ distributed random variable.

$$\begin{align}
\operatorname{P}(X=k)&= \frac{1}{k!} \int_0^\infty \lambda^k e^{-\lambda} \frac{(\frac{p}{1-p})^r}{\Gamma(r)} \lambda^{r-1} e^{-\frac{p}{1-p}\lambda} \, d \lambda \\
& = \frac{p^r(1-p)^{-r}}{\Gamma(r) k!} \int_0^\infty \lambda^{k+r-1} e^{-\lambda \frac{1}{1-p}} \, d \lambda \\
& = \frac{p^r(1-p)^{-r}}{\Gamma(r) k!} (1-p)^{k+r} \underbrace{\int_0^\infty \lambda^{k+r-1} e^{-\lambda} \, d \lambda}_{= \Gamma(r+k)} \\
& = \frac{\Gamma(r+k)}{\Gamma(r) k!} (1-p)^k p^r
\end{align}$$

Therefore we get $X\sim\operatorname{NegB}(r,p).$

Theorem—Compounding a Poisson distribution with rate parameter distributed according to an exponential distribution yields a geometric distribution.

Proof

Let $\pi(\lambda)=\frac1\beta e^{-\frac \lambda\beta}$ be a density of a $\operatorname{Exp}\left(\frac1\beta\right)$ distributed random variable. Using integration by parts k times yields:
$$\begin{align}
\operatorname{P}(X=k)&=\frac{1}{k!}\int_0^\infty \lambda^k e^{-\lambda} \frac1\beta e^{-\frac \lambda\beta} \, d\lambda\\
&=\frac{1}{k!\beta}\int_0^\infty \lambda^k e^{-\lambda\left(\frac{1+\beta}{\beta}\right)}\, d \lambda\\
&=\frac{1}{k!\beta}\cdot k!\left(\frac{\beta}{1+\beta}\right)^k\int_0^\infty e^{-\lambda\left(\frac{1+\beta}{\beta}\right)}\, d \lambda\\
&=\left(\frac{\beta}{1+\beta}\right)^k\left(\frac{1}{1+\beta}\right)
\end{align}$$
Therefore we get $X\sim\operatorname{Geo\left(\frac{1}{1+\beta}\right)}.$

== Table of mixed Poisson distributions ==
mixing distribution	mixed Poisson distribution
Dirac	Poisson
gamma, Erlang	negative binomial
exponential	geometric
inverse Gaussian	Sichel
Poisson	Neyman
generalized inverse Gaussian	Poisson-generalized inverse Gaussian
generalized gamma	Poisson-generalized gamma
generalized Pareto	Poisson-generalized Pareto
inverse-gamma	Poisson-inverse gamma
log-normal	Poisson-log-normal
Lomax	Poisson–Lomax
Pareto	Poisson–Pareto
Pearson’s family of distributions	Poisson–Pearson family
truncated normal	Poisson-truncated normal
uniform	Poisson-uniform
shifted gamma	Delaporte
beta with specific parameter values	Yule
