= Delaporte distribution =

Probability distribution in actuarial science

Delaporte
- Probability mass function When $\alpha$ and $\beta$ are 0, the distribution is the Poisson. When $\lambda$ is 0, the distribution is the negative binomial.

- Cumulative distribution function When $\alpha$ and $\beta$ are 0, the distribution is the Poisson. When $\lambda$ is 0, the distribution is the negative binomial.
- Parameters: $\lambda > 0$ (fixed mean) $\alpha, \beta > 0$ (parameters of variable mean)
- Support: $k \in \{0, 1, 2, \ldots\}$
- PMF: $\sum_{i=0}^k\frac{\Gamma(\alpha + i)\beta^i\lambda^{k-i}e^{-\lambda}}{\Gamma(\alpha)i!(1+\beta)^{\alpha+i}(k-i)!}$
- CDF: $\sum_{j=0}^k\sum_{i=0}^j\frac{\Gamma(\alpha + i)\beta^i\lambda^{j-i}e^{-\lambda}}{\Gamma(\alpha)i!(1+\beta)^{\alpha+i}(j-i)!}$
- Mean: $\lambda + \alpha\beta$
- Mode: $$\begin{cases}z, z+1 & \{z \in \mathbb{Z}\}:\; z = (\alpha-1)\beta+\lambda\\ \lfloor z \rfloor & \textrm{otherwise}\end{cases}$$
- Variance: $\lambda + \alpha\beta(1+\beta)$
- Skewness: See #Properties
- Excess kurtosis: See #Properties
- MGF: $\frac{e^{\lambda(e^{t}-1)}}{(1-\beta(e^{t}-1))^\alpha}$

The Delaporte distribution is a discrete probability distribution that has received attention in actuarial science. It can be defined using the convolution of a negative binomial distribution with a Poisson distribution. Just as the negative binomial distribution can be viewed as a Poisson distribution where the mean parameter is itself a random variable with a gamma distribution, the Delaporte distribution can be viewed as a compound distribution based on a Poisson distribution, where there are two components to the mean parameter: a fixed component, which has the $\lambda$ parameter, and a gamma-distributed variable component, which has the $\alpha$ and $\beta$ parameters. The distribution is named for Pierre Delaporte, who analyzed it in relation to automobile accident claim counts in 1959, although it appeared in a different form as early as 1934 in a paper by Rolf von Lüders, where it was called the Formel II distribution.

== Properties ==
The skewness of the Delaporte distribution is:

$\frac{\lambda + \alpha\beta(1+3\beta+2\beta^2)}{\left(\lambda + \alpha\beta(1+\beta)\right)^{\frac{3}{2}}}$

The excess kurtosis of the distribution is:

$\frac{\lambda+3\lambda^2+\alpha\beta(1+6\lambda+6\lambda\beta+7\beta+12\beta^2+6\beta^3+3\alpha\beta+6\alpha\beta^2+3\alpha\beta^3)}{\left(\lambda + \alpha\beta(1+\beta)\right)^2}$
