= Normalizing constant =

Constant a such that af(x) is a probability measure

In probability theory, a normalizing constant or normalizing factor is used to reduce any nonnegative function whose integral is finite to a probability density function.

For example, a Gaussian function can be normalized into a probability density function, which gives the standard normal distribution. In Bayes' theorem, a normalizing constant is used to ensure that the sum of all possible hypotheses equals 1. Other uses of normalizing constants include making the value of a Legendre polynomial at 1 and in the orthogonality of orthonormal functions.

A similar concept has been used in areas other than probability, such as for polynomials.

== Definition ==
In probability theory, a normalizing constant is a constant by which an everywhere non-negative function must be multiplied so the area under its graph is 1, e.g., to make it a probability density function or a probability mass function.

== Examples ==
If we start from the simple Gaussian function
$$p(x) = e^{-x^2/2}, \quad x\in(-\infty,\infty)$$
we have the corresponding Gaussian integral
$$\int_{-\infty}^\infty p(x) \, dx = \int_{-\infty}^\infty e^{-x^2/2} \, dx = \sqrt{2\pi\,},$$

Now if we use the latter's reciprocal value as a normalizing constant for the former, defining a function $\varphi(x)$ as
$$\varphi(x) = \frac{1}{\sqrt{2\pi\,}} p(x) = \frac{1}{\sqrt{2\pi\,}} e^{-x^2/2}$$
so that its integral is unit
$$\int_{-\infty}^\infty \varphi(x) \, dx = \int_{-\infty}^\infty \frac{1}{\sqrt{2\pi\,}} e^{-x^2/2} \, dx = 1$$
then the function $\varphi(x)$ is a probability density function. This is the density of the standard normal distribution. (Standard, in this case, means the expected value is 0 and the variance is 1.)

And constant $\frac{1}{\sqrt{2\pi}}$ is the normalizing constant of function $p(x)$.

Similarly,
$$\sum_{n=0}^\infty \frac{\lambda^n}{n!} = e^{\lambda} ,$$
and consequently
$$f(n) = \frac{\lambda^n e^{-\lambda}}{n!}$$
is a probability mass function on the set of all nonnegative integers. This is the probability mass function of the Poisson distribution with expected value λ.

If the probability density function is a function of various parameters, so too will be its normalizing constant. The parametrised normalizing constant for the Boltzmann distribution plays a central role in statistical mechanics. In that context, the normalizing constant is called the partition function.

== Bayes' theorem ==
Bayes' theorem says that the posterior probability measure is proportional to the product of the prior probability measure and the likelihood function. Proportional to implies that one must multiply or divide by a normalizing constant to assign measure 1 to the whole space, i.e., to get a probability measure. In a simple discrete case we have
$$P(H_0\mid D) = \frac{P(D\mid H_0)P(H_0)}{P(D)}$$
where $P(H_0)$ is the prior probability that the hypothesis is true; $P(D\mid H_0)$ is the conditional probability of the data given that the hypothesis is true, but given that the data are known it is the likelihood of the hypothesis (or its parameters) given the data; $P(H_0|D)$ is the posterior probability that the hypothesis is true given the data. $P(D)$ should be the probability of producing the data, but on its own is difficult to calculate, so an alternative way to describe this relationship is as one of proportionality:
$$P(H_0\mid D) \propto P(D\mid H_0)P(H_0) \text{ as a function of } H_0.$$
Since $P(H\mid D)$ is a probability, the sum over all possible (mutually exclusive) hypotheses should be 1, leading to the conclusion that
$$P(H_0\mid D) = \frac{P(D\mid H_0)P(H_0)}{\displaystyle\sum_i P(D\mid H_i)P(H_i)} .$$
In this case, the reciprocal of the value
$$P(D) = \sum_i P(D\mid H_i)P(H_i) \;$$
is the normalizing constant. It can be extended from countably many hypotheses to uncountably many by replacing the sum by an integral.

For concreteness, there are many methods of estimating the normalizing constant for practical purposes. Methods include the bridge sampling technique, the naive Monte Carlo estimator, the generalized harmonic mean estimator, and importance sampling.

== Non-probabilistic uses ==
The Legendre polynomials are characterized by orthogonality with respect to the uniform measure on the interval [−1, 1] and the fact that they are normalized so that their value at 1 is 1. The constant by which one multiplies a polynomial so its value at 1 is a normalizing constant.

Orthonormal functions are normalized such that
$$\langle f_i , \, f_j \rangle = \, \delta_{i,j}$$
with respect to some inner product ⟨f, g⟩.

The constant 1/√2 is used to establish the hyperbolic functions cosh and sinh from the lengths of the adjacent and opposite sides of a hyperbolic triangle.

== See also ==
- Normalization (statistics)
