= List of things named after Peter Gustav Lejeune Dirichlet =

The German mathematician Peter Gustav Lejeune Dirichlet (1805–1859) is the eponym of many things.

== Mathematics ==
- Theorems named Dirichlet's theorem:
  - Dirichlet's approximation theorem (diophantine approximation)
  - Dirichlet's theorem on arithmetic progressions (number theory, specifically prime numbers)
  - Dirichlet's unit theorem (algebraic number theory and rings)
- Dirichlet algebra
- Dirichlet beta function
- Dirichlet boundary condition (differential equations)
  - Neumann–Dirichlet method
- Dirichlet characters (number theory, specifically zeta and L-functions. 1831)
- Dirichlet conditions (Fourier series)
- Dirichlet convolution (number theory and arithmetic functions)
- Dirichlet density (number theory)
  - Dirichlet average
- Dirichlet distribution (probability theory)
  - Dirichlet-multinomial distribution
  - Dirichlet negative multinomial distribution
  - Generalized Dirichlet distribution (probability theory)
  - Grouped Dirichlet distribution
  - Inverted Dirichlet distribution
  - Matrix variate Dirichlet distribution
- Dirichlet divisor problem (currently unsolved) (Number theory)
- Dirichlet eigenvalue
- Dirichlet's ellipsoidal problem
- Dirichlet eta function (number theory)
- Dirichlet form
- Dirichlet function (topology)
- Dirichlet hyperbola method
- Dirichlet integral
- Dirichlet kernel (functional analysis, Fourier series)
- Dirichlet L-function
- Dirichlet principle
- Dirichlet problem (partial differential equations)
- Dirichlet process
  - Dependent Dirichlet process
  - Hierarchical Dirichlet process
  - Imprecise Dirichlet process
- Dirichlet ring (number theory)
- Dirichlet series (analytic number theory)
  - Dirichlet series inversion
  - General Dirichlet series
- Dirichlet space
- Dirichlet stability criterion (dynamical systems)
- Dirichlet tessellation, Dirichlet cell, Dirichlet polygon also called a Voronoi diagram (geometry)
- Dirichlet's test (analysis)
- Dirichlet's energy
- Pigeonhole principle/Dirichlet's box (or drawer) principle (combinatorics)
- Latent Dirichlet allocation
- Class number formula

== Physics ==
- Dirichlet membrane

== Non-mathematical ==
- 11665 Dirichlet
- Dirichlet (crater)
- Dirichlet–Jackson Basin
