= Dirichlet (disambiguation) =

Dirichlet may refer to

- Peter Gustav Lejeune Dirichlet, a 19th-century German mathematician

- Dirichlet (crater), named after him
- 11665 Dirichlet, a minor planet named after him

== See also ==
- List of things named after Peter Gustav Lejeune Dirichlet
