= Matrix variate beta distribution =

Generalization of beta distribution

- Notation: ${\rm B}_{p}(a,b)$
- Parameters: $a,b$
- Support: $p\times p$ matrices with both $U$ and $I_p-U$ positive definite
- PDF: $\left\{\beta_p\left(a,b\right)\right\}^{-1} \det\left(U\right)^{a-(p+1)/2}\det\left(I_p-U\right)^{b-(p+1)/2}.$
- CDF: ${}_1F_1\left(a;a+b;iZ\right)$

In statistics, the matrix variate beta distribution is a generalization of the beta distribution. It is also called the MANOVA ensemble and the Jacobi ensemble.

If $U$ is a $p\times p$ positive definite matrix with a matrix variate beta distribution, and $a,b>(p-1)/2$ are real parameters, we write $U\sim B_p\left(a,b\right)$ (sometimes $B_p^I\left(a,b\right)$). The probability density function for $U$ is:
$$\left\{\beta_p\left(a,b\right)\right\}^{-1}
\det\left(U\right)^{a-(p+1)/2}\det\left(I_p-U\right)^{b-(p+1)/2}.$$

Here $\beta_p\left(a,b\right)$ is the multivariate beta function:

$$\beta_p\left(a,b\right)=\frac{\Gamma_p\left(a\right)\Gamma_p\left(b\right)}{\Gamma_p\left(a+b\right)}$$

where $\Gamma_p\left(a\right)$ is the multivariate gamma function given by

$$\Gamma_p\left(a\right)= \pi^{p(p-1)/4}\prod_{i=1}^p\Gamma\left(a-(i-1)/2\right).$$

== Theorems ==
=== Distribution of matrix inverse ===
If $U\sim B_p(a,b)$ then the density of $X=U^{-1}$ is given by

$$\frac{1}{\beta_p\left(a,b\right)}\det(X)^{-(a+b)}\det\left(X-I_p\right)^{b-(p+1)/2}$$

provided that $X>I_p$ and $a,b>(p-1)/2$.

=== Orthogonal transform ===
If $U\sim B_p(a,b)$ and $H$ is a constant $p\times p$ orthogonal matrix, then $HUH^T\sim B(a,b).$

Also, if $H$ is a random orthogonal $p\times p$ matrix which is independent of $U$, then $HUH^T\sim B_p(a,b)$, distributed independently of $H$.

If $A$ is any constant $q\times p$, $q\leq p$ matrix of rank $q$, then $AUA^T$ has a generalized matrix variate beta distribution, specifically $AUA^T\sim GB_q\left(a,b;AA^T,0\right)$.

=== Partitioned matrix results ===
If $U\sim B_p\left(a,b\right)$ and we partition $U$ as

$$U=\begin{bmatrix}
U_{11} & U_{12}  \\
U_{21} & U_{22} \end{bmatrix}$$

where $U_{11}$ is $p_1\times p_1$ and $U_{22}$ is $p_2\times p_2$, then defining the Schur complement $U_{22\cdot 1}$ as $U_{22}-U_{21}{U_{11}}^{-1}U_{12}$ gives the following results:

- $U_{11}$ is independent of $U_{22\cdot 1}$
- $U_{11}\sim B_{p_1}\left(a,b\right)$
- $U_{22\cdot 1}\sim B_{p_2}\left(a-p_1/2,b\right)$
- $U_{21}\mid U_{11},U_{22\cdot 1}$ has an inverted matrix variate t distribution, specifically $U_{21}\mid U_{11},U_{22\cdot 1}\sim IT_{p_2,p_1} \left(2b-p+1,0,I_{p_2}-U_{22\cdot 1},U_{11}(I_{p_1}-U_{11})\right).$

=== Wishart results ===
Mitra proves the following theorem which illustrates a useful property of the matrix variate beta distribution. Suppose $S_1,S_2$ are independent Wishart $p\times p$ matrices $S_1\sim W_p(n_1,\Sigma), S_2\sim W_p(n_2,\Sigma)$. Assume that $\Sigma$ is positive definite and that $n_1+n_2\geq p$. If

$$U = S^{-1/2}S_1\left(S^{-1/2}\right)^T,$$

where $S=S_1+S_2$, then $U$ has a matrix variate beta distribution $B_p(n_1/2,n_2/2)$. In particular, $U$ is independent of $\Sigma$.

== Spectral density ==
The spectral density is expressed by a Jacobi polynomial.

=== Extreme value distribution ===
The distribution of the largest eigenvalue is well approximated by a transform of the Tracy–Widom distribution.

== See also ==
- Matrix variate Dirichlet distribution
