= Inverse Dirichlet distribution =

In statistics, the inverse Dirichlet distribution is a derivation of the matrix variate Dirichlet distribution. It is related to the inverse Wishart distribution.

Suppose $U_1,\ldots,U_r$ are $p\times p$ positive definite matrices with a matrix variate Dirichlet distribution, $\left(U_1,\ldots,U_r\right)\sim D_p\left(a_1,\ldots,a_r;a_{r+1}\right)$. Then $X_i={U_i}^{-1},i=1,\ldots,r$ have an inverse Dirichlet distribution, written $\left(X_1,\ldots,X_r\right)\sim \operatorname{ID}\left(a_1,\ldots,a_r;a_{r+1}\right)$. Their joint probability density function is given by

$$\left\{\beta_p\left(a_1,\ldots,a_r;a_{r+1}\right)\right\}^{-1}
\prod_{i=1}^r
\det\left(X_i\right)^{-a_i-(p+1)/2}\det\left(I_p-\sum_{i=1}^r{X_i}^{-1}\right)^{a_{r+1}-(p+1)/2}$$
