= Lauricella hypergeometric series =

Well defined hypergeometric series discovered by Giuseppe Lauricella

In 1893 Giuseppe Lauricella defined and studied four hypergeometric series F_{A}, F_{B}, F_{C}, F_{D} of three variables. They are (Lauricella 1893):

$$F_A^{(3)}(a,b_1,b_2,b_3,c_1,c_2,c_3;x_1,x_2,x_3) =
\sum_{i_1,i_2,i_3=0}^{\infty} \frac{(a)_{i_1+i_2+i_3} (b_1)_{i_1} (b_2)_{i_2} (b_3)_{i_3}} {(c_1)_{i_1} (c_2)_{i_2} (c_3)_{i_3} \,i_1! \,i_2! \,i_3!} \,x_1^{i_1}x_2^{i_2}x_3^{i_3}$$

for |x_{1}| + |x_{2}| + |x_{3}| < 1 and

$$F_B^{(3)}(a_1,a_2,a_3,b_1,b_2,b_3,c;x_1,x_2,x_3) =
\sum_{i_1,i_2,i_3=0}^{\infty} \frac{(a_1)_{i_1} (a_2)_{i_2} (a_3)_{i_3} (b_1)_{i_1} (b_2)_{i_2} (b_3)_{i_3}} {(c)_{i_1+i_2+i_3} \,i_1! \,i_2! \,i_3!} \,x_1^{i_1}x_2^{i_2}x_3^{i_3}$$

for |x_{1}| < 1, |x_{2}| < 1, |x_{3}| < 1 and

$$F_C^{(3)}(a,b,c_1,c_2,c_3;x_1,x_2,x_3) =
\sum_{i_1,i_2,i_3=0}^{\infty} \frac{(a)_{i_1+i_2+i_3} (b)_{i_1+i_2+i_3}} {(c_1)_{i_1} (c_2)_{i_2} (c_3)_{i_3} \,i_1! \,i_2! \,i_3!} \,x_1^{i_1}x_2^{i_2}x_3^{i_3}$$

for |x_{1}|^{1/2} + |x_{2}|^{1/2} + |x_{3}|^{1/2} < 1 and

$$F_D^{(3)}(a,b_1,b_2,b_3,c;x_1,x_2,x_3) =
\sum_{i_1,i_2,i_3=0}^{\infty} \frac{(a)_{i_1+i_2+i_3} (b_1)_{i_1} (b_2)_{i_2} (b_3)_{i_3}} {(c)_{i_1+i_2+i_3} \,i_1! \,i_2! \,i_3!} \,x_1^{i_1}x_2^{i_2}x_3^{i_3}$$

for |x_{1}| < 1, |x_{2}| < 1, |x_{3}| < 1. Here the Pochhammer symbol (q)_{i} indicates the i-th rising factorial of q, i.e.

$$(q)_i = q\,(q+1) \cdots (q+i-1) = \frac{\Gamma(q+i)}{\Gamma(q)}~,$$

where the second equality is true for all complex $q$ except $q=0,-1,-2,\ldots$.

These functions can be extended to other values of the variables x_{1}, x_{2}, x_{3} by means of analytic continuation.

Lauricella also indicated the existence of ten other hypergeometric functions of three variables. These were named F_{E}, F_{F}, ..., F_{T} and studied by Shanti Saran in 1954 (Saran 1954). There are therefore a total of 14 Lauricella–Saran hypergeometric functions.

== Generalization to n variables ==
These functions can be straightforwardly extended to n variables. One writes for example

$$F_A^{(n)}(a, b_1,\ldots,b_n, c_1,\ldots,c_n; x_1,\ldots,x_n) =
\sum_{i_1,\ldots,i_n=0}^{\infty} \frac{(a)_{i_1+\cdots+i_n} (b_1)_{i_1} \cdots (b_n)_{i_n}} {(c_1)_{i_1} \cdots (c_n)_{i_n} \,i_1! \cdots \,i_n!} \,x_1^{i_1} \cdots x_n^{i_n} ~,$$

where |x_{1}| + ... + |x_{n}| < 1. These generalized series too are sometimes referred to as Lauricella functions.

When n = 2, the Lauricella functions correspond to the Appell hypergeometric series of two variables:

$$F_A^{(2)} \equiv F_2 ,\quad F_B^{(2)} \equiv F_3 ,\quad F_C^{(2)} \equiv F_4 ,\quad F_D^{(2)} \equiv F_1.$$

When n = 1, all four functions reduce to the Gauss hypergeometric function:

$$F_A^{(1)}(a,b,c;x) \equiv F_B^{(1)}(a,b,c;x) \equiv F_C^{(1)}(a,b,c;x) \equiv F_D^{(1)}(a,b,c;x) \equiv {_2}F_1(a,b;c;x).$$

== Integral representation of F^{(3)}_{B} ==
By exploiting the result,

$$\frac{1}{(c)_{i_1+i_2+i_3}}=\frac{\Gamma(c)}{\Gamma(\delta)\Gamma(c-\epsilon)\Gamma(\epsilon-\delta)}\frac{\operatorname{B}(\delta+i_1,\epsilon-\delta+i_3)\operatorname{B}(\epsilon+i_1+i_3,c-\epsilon+i_2)}{(\delta)_{i_1}(c-\epsilon)_{i_2}(\epsilon-\delta)_{i_3}},$$

(where $\operatorname{B}(x,y)$ denotes the Eulerian integral of the first kind), one can obtain from the series of $F_B^{(3)}$:

$$F_B^{(3)}(a_1,a_2,a_3,b_1,b_2,b_3;c;x_1,x_2,x_3)=\frac{\Gamma(c)}{\Gamma(\delta)\Gamma(c-\epsilon)\Gamma(\epsilon-\delta)}
\int_0^1\!\int_0^1 t^{\delta-1}s^{\epsilon-1}(1-t)^{\epsilon-\delta-1}(1-s)^{c-\epsilon-1}
{_2F_1}(a_1,b_1;\delta;x_1st){_2F_1}(a_2,b_2;c-\epsilon;x_2(1-s))
{_2F_1}(a_3,b_3;\epsilon-\delta;x_3s(1-t))\,\mathrm ds\,\mathrm dt,$$

where

$$(a_1,a_2,a_3,b_1,b_2,b_3,c,\delta,\epsilon,x_1,x_2,x_3)\in\mathbb C\land c\notin\mathbb{Z}^{(-,0)}\land |x_1|<1\land |x_2|<1\land |x_3|<1\land \Re c>\Re\epsilon>\Re\delta>0.$$

Special cases include:

$$\int_0^{\beta}\!\int_0^{\alpha}\frac{\mathbf{K}(\sqrt{x_2(\alpha-s)})}{\sqrt{t(\beta-t)(1-x_1st)(1-x_3s(\beta-t))}}\,\mathrm ds\,\mathrm dt=\frac{\pi^2\alpha}{2}{F_B^{(3)}}\left(\frac12,\frac12,\frac12,\frac12,\frac12,\frac12;2;\alpha\beta x_1,\alpha x_2,\alpha\beta x_3\right)$$

$$\int_0^{\beta}\!\int_0^{\alpha}\frac{\mathbf{E}(\sqrt{x_2(\alpha-s)})}{\sqrt{t(\beta-t)(1-x_1st)(1-x_3s(\beta-t))}}\,\mathrm ds\,\mathrm dt=\frac{\pi^2\alpha}{2}{F_B^{(3)}}\left(-\frac12,\frac12,\frac12,\frac12,\frac12,\frac12;2;\alpha\beta x_1,\alpha x_2,\alpha\beta x_3\right)$$

$$\int_0^{\beta}\!\int_0^{\alpha}\frac{s\mathbf{K}(\sqrt{x_1 s})\mathbf{K}(\sqrt{x_3 st})}{\sqrt{(\alpha-s)(1-x_2(\alpha-s))}}\,\mathrm ds\,\mathrm dt=\frac{\pi^2\alpha^{3/2}\beta}{3}{F_B^{(3)}}\left(\frac12,\frac12,\frac12,\frac12,\frac12,\frac12;\frac52;\alpha\beta x_1,\alpha x_2,\alpha\beta x_3\right)$$

$$\int_0^{\beta}\!\int_0^{\alpha}\frac{s\mathbf{E}(\sqrt{x_1 s})\mathbf{E}(\sqrt{x_3 st})}{\sqrt{(\alpha-s)(1-x_2(\alpha-s))}}\,\mathrm ds\,\mathrm dt=\frac{\pi^2\alpha^{3/2}\beta}{3}{F_B^{(3)}}\left(-\frac12,\frac12,-\frac12,\frac12,\frac12,\frac12;\frac52;\alpha\beta x_1,\alpha x_2,\alpha\beta x_3\right)$$

where $\mathbf{K}(k)$ and $\mathbf{E}(k)$ are the complete elliptic integrals of the first and second kind, respectively.

== Integral representation of F_{D} ==
In analogy with Appell's function F_{1}, Lauricella's F_{D} can be written as a one-dimensional Euler-type integral for any number n of variables:

$$F_D^{(n)}(a, b_1,\ldots,b_n, c; x_1,\ldots,x_n) =
\frac{\Gamma(c)} {\Gamma(a) \Gamma(c-a)} \int_0^1 t^{a-1} (1-t)^{c-a-1} (1-x_1t)^{-b_1} \cdots (1-x_nt)^{-b_n} \,\mathrm{d}t, \qquad \operatorname{Re} c > \operatorname{Re} a > 0 ~.$$

This representation can be easily verified by means of Taylor expansion of the integrand, followed by termwise integration. The representation implies that the incomplete elliptic integral Π is a special case of Lauricella's function F_{D} with three variables:

$$\Pi(n,\phi,k) =
\int_0^{\phi} \frac{\mathrm{d} \theta} {(1 - n \sin^2 \theta) \sqrt{1 - k^2 \sin^2 \theta}} =
\sin (\phi) \,F_D^{(3)}(\tfrac 1 2, 1, \tfrac 1 2, \tfrac 1 2, \tfrac 3 2; n \sin^2 \phi, \sin^2 \phi, k^2 \sin^2 \phi),
\qquad |\operatorname{Re} \phi| < \frac{\pi}{2} ~.$$

== Finite-sum solutions of F_{D} ==
Case 1 : $a>c$, $a-c$ a positive integer

One can relate F_{D} to the Carlson R function $R_n$ via

$$F_D(a,\overline{b},c,\overline{z})=R_{a-c}(\overline{b^*}, \overline{z^*}) \cdot \prod_i (z_i^*)^{b_i^*}
= \frac{\Gamma(a-c+1)\Gamma(b^*)}{\Gamma(a-c+b^*)} \cdot D_{a-c}(\overline{b^*}, \overline{z^*}) \cdot \prod_i (z_i^*)^{b_i^*}$$

with the iterative sum

$D_n(\overline{b^*}, \overline{z^*})=\frac{1}{n} \sum_{k=1}^{n} \left(\sum_{i=1}^{N} b_i^* \cdot (z_i^*)^k\right) \cdot D_{n-k}$ and $D_0=1$

where it can be exploited that the Carlson R function with $n>0$ has an exact representation (see for more information).

The vectors are defined as

$\overline{b^*}=\left[\overline{b}, c-\sum_i b_i\right]$

$\overline{z^*}=\left[\frac{1}{1-z_1}, \ldots, \frac{1}{1-z_{N-1}}, 1\right]$

where the length of $\overline{z}$ and $\overline{b}$ is $N-1$, while the vectors $\overline{z^*}$ and $\overline{b^*}$ have length $N$.

Case 2: $c>a$, $c-a$ a positive integer

In this case there is also a known analytic form, but it is rather complicated to write down and involves several steps. See for more information.
