= Dirichlet average =

Averages of functions under the Dirichlet distribution

Dirichlet averages are averages of functions under the Dirichlet distribution. An important one are dirichlet averages that have a certain argument structure, namely

$$F(\mathbf{b};\mathbf{z})=\int f( \mathbf{u} \cdot \mathbf{z}) \, d \mu_b(\mathbf{u}),$$

where $\mathbf{u}\cdot\mathbf{z}=\sum_i^N u_i \cdot z_i$ and $d \mu_b(\mathbf{u})=u_1^{b_1-1} \cdots u_N^{b_N-1} d\mathbf{u}$ is the Dirichlet measure with dimension N. They were introduced by the mathematician Bille C. Carlson in the '70s who noticed that the simple notion of this type of averaging generalizes and unifies many special functions, among them generalized hypergeometric functions or various orthogonal polynomials:. They also play an important role for the solution of elliptic integrals (see Carlson symmetric form) and are connected to statistical applications in various ways, for example in Bayesian analysis.

== Notable Dirichlet averages ==
Some Dirichlet averages are so fundamental that they are named. A few are listed below.

=== R-function ===
The (Carlson) R-function is the Dirichlet average of $x^n$,

$$R_n(\mathbf{b}, \mathbf{z})=\int (\mathbf{u} \cdot \mathbf{z})^n \, d \mu_b(\mathbf{u})$$

with $n$. Sometimes $R_n(\mathbf{b}, \mathbf{z})$ is also denoted by $R(-n;\mathbf{b}, \mathbf{z})$.

Exact solutions:

For $n \geq 0, n \in \mathbb{N}$ it is possible to write an exact solution in the form of an iterative sum

$$R_n(\mathbf{b},\mathbf{z})=\frac{\Gamma(n+1)\Gamma(b)}{\Gamma(b+n)} \cdot D_n \text{ with } D_n=\frac{1}{n}\sum_{k=1}^n \left(\sum_{i=1}^N b_i \cdot z_i^k\right) \cdot D_{n-k}$$

where $D_0=1$, $N$ is the dimension of $\mathbf{b}$ or $\mathbf{z}$ and $b=\sum b_i$.

=== S-function ===
The (Carlson) S-function is the Dirichlet average of $e^x$,

$$S(\mathbf{b}, \mathbf{z})=\int \exp(\mathbf{u} \cdot \mathbf{z}) \, d \mu_b(\mathbf{u}).$$
