= Grouped Dirichlet distribution =

Probability distribution

In statistics, the grouped Dirichlet distribution (GDD) is a multivariate generalization of the Dirichlet distribution It was first described by Ng et al. 2008. The Grouped Dirichlet distribution arises in the analysis of categorical data where some observations could fall into any of a set of other 'crisp' category. For example, one may have a data set consisting of cases and controls under two different conditions. With complete data, the cross-classification of disease status forms a 2(case/control)-x-(condition/no-condition) table with cell probabilities

| | Treatment | No Treatment |
| Controls | θ_{1} | θ_{2} |
| Cases | θ_{3} | θ_{4} |

If, however, the data includes, say, non-respondents which are known to be controls or cases, then the cross-classification of disease status forms a 2-x-3 table. The probability of the last column is the sum of the probabilities of the first two columns in each row, e.g.

| | Treatment | No Treatment | Missing |
| Controls | θ_{1} | θ_{2} | θ_{1}+θ_{2} |
| Cases | θ_{3} | θ_{4} | θ_{3}+θ_{4} |

The GDD allows the full estimation of the cell probabilities under such aggregation conditions.

== Probability Distribution ==
Consider the closed simplex set $\mathcal{T}_n=\left\{\left(x_1,\ldots x_n\right)\left|x_i\geq 0, i=1,\cdots,n, \sum_{i=1}^n x_n =1\right.\right\}$ and $\mathbf{x}\in\mathcal{T}_n$. Writing $\mathbf{x}_{-n}=\left(x_1,\ldots,x_{n-1}\right)$ for the first $n-1$ elements of a member of $\mathcal{T}_n$, the distribution of $\mathbf{x}$ for two partitions has a density function given by

$$\operatorname{GD}_{n,2,s}\left(\left.\mathbf{x}_{-n}\right|\mathbf{a},\mathbf{b}\right)=
\frac{
\left(\prod_{i=1}  ^n x_i^{a_i-1}\right)\cdot
\left(\sum_{i=1}   ^s x_i        \right)^{b_1}\cdot
\left(\sum_{i=s+1} ^n x_i        \right)^{b_2}
}{
\operatorname{\Beta}\left(a_1,\ldots,a_s\right)\cdot
\operatorname{\Beta}\left(a_{s+1},\ldots,a_n\right)\cdot
\operatorname{\Beta}\left(b_1+\sum_{i=1}^sa_i,b_2+\sum_{i=s+1}^n a_i\right)
}$$

where $\operatorname{\Beta}\left(\mathbf{a}\right)$ is the Multivariate beta function.

Ng et al. went on to define an m partition grouped Dirichlet distribution with density of $\mathbf{x}_{-n}$ given by

$$\operatorname{GD}_{n,m,\mathbf{s}}\left(\left.\mathbf{x}_{-n}\right|\mathbf{a},\mathbf{b}\right) =
c_m^{-1}\cdot
\left(\prod_{i=1}^n x_i^{a_i-1}\right)\cdot
\prod_{j=1}^m\left(\sum_{k=s_{j-1}+1}^{s_j}x_k\right)^{b_j}$$

where $\mathbf{s} = \left(s_1,\ldots,s_m\right)$ is a vector of integers with $0=s_0<s_1\leqslant\cdots\leqslant s_m=n$. The normalizing constant given by

$$c_m=\left\{\prod_{j=1}^m\operatorname{\Beta}\left(a_{s_{j-1}+1},\ldots,a_{s_j}\right)\right\}\cdot
\operatorname{\Beta}\left(b_1+\sum_{k=1}^{s_1}a_k,\ldots,b_m+\sum_{k=s_{m-1}+1}^{s_m}a_k\right)$$

The authors went on to use these distributions in the context of three different applications in medical science.
