= Matrix variate Dirichlet distribution =

In statistics, the matrix variate Dirichlet distribution is a generalization of the matrix variate beta distribution and of the Dirichlet distribution.

Suppose $U_1,\ldots,U_r$ are $p\times p$ positive definite matrices with $I_p-\sum_{i=1}^rU_i$ also positive-definite, where $I_p$ is the $p\times p$ identity matrix. Then we say that the $U_i$ have a matrix variate Dirichlet distribution, $\left(U_1,\ldots,U_r\right)\sim D_p\left(a_1,\ldots,a_r;a_{r+1}\right)$, if their joint probability density function is

$$\left\{\beta_p\left(a_1,\ldots,a_r,a_{r+1}\right)\right\}^{-1}\prod_{i=1}^{r}\det\left(U_i\right)^{a_i-(p+1)/2}\det\left(I_p-\sum_{i=1}^rU_i\right)^{a_{r+1}-(p+1)/2}$$

where $a_i>(p-1)/2,i=1,\ldots,r+1$ and $\beta_p\left(\cdots\right)$ is the multivariate beta function.

If we write $U_{r+1}=I_p-\sum_{i=1}^r U_i$ then the PDF takes the simpler form

$$\left\{\beta_p\left(a_1,\ldots,a_{r+1}\right)\right\}^{-1}\prod_{i=1}^{r+1}\det\left(U_i\right)^{a_i-(p+1)/2},$$

on the understanding that $\sum_{i=1}^{r+1}U_i=I_p$.

== Theorems ==
=== generalization of chi square-Dirichlet result ===
Suppose $S_i\sim W_p\left(n_i,\Sigma\right),i=1,\ldots,r+1$ are independently distributed Wishart $p\times p$ positive definite matrices. Then, defining $U_i=S^{-1/2}S_i\left(S^{-1/2}\right)^T$ (where $S=\sum_{i=1}^{r+1}S_i$ is the sum of the matrices and $S^{1/2}\left(S^{-1/2}\right)^T$ is any reasonable factorization of $S$), we have

$$\left(U_1,\ldots,U_r\right)\sim D_p\left(n_1/2,...,n_{r+1}/2\right).$$

=== Marginal distribution ===
If $\left(U_1,\ldots,U_r\right)\sim D_p\left(a_1,\ldots,a_{r+1}\right)$, and if $s\leq r$, then:

$$\left(U_1,\ldots,U_s\right)\sim D_p\left(a_1,\ldots,a_s,\sum_{i=s+1}^{r+1}a_i\right)$$

=== Conditional distribution ===
Also, with the same notation as above, the density of $\left(U_{s+1},\ldots,U_r\right)\left|\left(U_1,\ldots,U_s\right)\right.$ is given by

$$\frac{
\prod_{i=s+1}^{r+1}\det\left(U_i\right)^{a_i-(p+1)/2}
}{
\beta_p\left(a_{s+1},\ldots,a_{r+1}\right)\det\left(I_p-\sum_{i=1}^{s}U_i\right)^{\sum_{i=s+1}^{r+1}a_i-(p+1)/2}
}$$

where we write $U_{r+1} = I_p-\sum_{i=1}^rU_i$.

=== partitioned distribution ===
Suppose $\left(U_1,\ldots,U_r\right)\sim D_p\left(a_1,\ldots,a_{r+1}\right)$ and suppose that $S_1,\ldots,S_t$ is a partition of $\left[r+1\right]=\left\{1,\ldots r+1\right\}$ (that is, $\cup_{i=1}^tS_i=\left[r+1\right]$ and $S_i\cap S_j=\emptyset$ if $i\neq j$). Then, writing $U_{(j)}=\sum_{i\in S_j}U_i$ and $a_{(j)}=\sum_{i\in S_j}a_i$ (with $U_{r+1}=I_p-\sum_{i=1}^r U_r$), we have:

$$\left(U_{(1)},\ldots U_{(t)}\right)\sim D_p\left(a_{(1)},\ldots,a_{(t)}\right).$$

=== partitions ===
Suppose $\left(U_1,\ldots,U_r\right)\sim D_p\left(a_1,\ldots,a_{r+1}\right)$. Define

$$U_i=
\left( \begin{array}{rr}
U_{11(i)} & U_{12(i)} \\
U_{21(i)} & U_{22(i)}
\end{array} \right) \qquad i=1,\ldots,r$$

where $U_{11(i)}$ is $p_1\times p_1$ and $U_{22(i)}$ is $p_2\times p_2$. Writing the Schur complement $U_{22\cdot 1(i)} = U_{21(i)} U_{11(i)}^{-1}U_{12(i)}$ we have

$$\left(U_{11(1)},\ldots,U_{11(r)}\right)\sim D_{p_1}\left(a_1,\ldots,a_{r+1}\right)$$

and

$$\left(U_{22.1(1)},\ldots,U_{22.1(r)}\right)\sim D_{p_2}\left(a_1-p_1/2,\ldots,a_r-p_1/2,a_{r+1}-p_1/2+p_1r/2\right).$$

== See also ==
- Inverse Dirichlet distribution
