= General Dirichlet series =

Infinite series in mathematical analysis

In the field of mathematical analysis, a general Dirichlet series is an infinite series that takes the form of

$$\sum_{n=1}^\infty a_n e^{-\lambda_n s},$$

where $a_n$, $s$ are complex numbers and $\{\lambda_n\}$ is a strictly increasing sequence of nonnegative real numbers that tends to infinity.

A simple observation shows that an 'ordinary' Dirichlet series

$$\sum_{n=1}^\infty \frac{a_n}{n^s},$$

is obtained by substituting $\lambda_n=\ln n$, while a power series

$$\sum_{n=1}^\infty a_n (e^{-s})^n,$$

is obtained when $\lambda_n=n$.

== Fundamental theorems ==
If a Dirichlet series is convergent at $s_0=\sigma_0+t_0i$, then it is uniformly convergent in the domain

$$|\arg(s-s_0)| \leq \theta < \frac \pi 2,$$

and convergent for any $s=\sigma+ti$ where $\sigma>\sigma_0$.

There are now three possibilities regarding the convergence of a Dirichlet series, i.e. it may converge for all, for none or for some values of s. In the latter case, there exist a $\sigma_c$ such that the series is convergent for $\sigma>\sigma_c$ and divergent for $\sigma<\sigma_c$. By convention, $\sigma_c=\infty$ if the series converges nowhere and $\sigma_c=-\infty$ if the series converges everywhere on the complex plane.

== Abscissa of convergence ==
The abscissa of convergence of a Dirichlet series can be defined as $\sigma_c$ above. Another equivalent definition is

$$\sigma_c = \inf\left\{\sigma\in\mathbb{R}:\sum_{n=1}^\infty a_n e^{-\lambda_n s} \text{ converges for every } s \text{ for which } \operatorname{Re}(s)>\sigma \right\}.$$

The line $\sigma=\sigma_c$ is called the line of convergence. The half-plane of convergence is defined as

$$\mathbb{C}_{\sigma_c}=\{s\in\mathbb{C}: \operatorname{Re}(s)>\sigma_c\}.$$

The abscissa, line and half-plane of convergence of a Dirichlet series are analogous to radius, boundary and disk of convergence of a power series.

On the line of convergence, the question of convergence remains open as in the case of power series. However, if a Dirichlet series converges and diverges at different points on the same vertical line, then this line must be the line of convergence. The proof is implicit in the definition of abscissa of convergence. An example would be the series

$$\sum_{n=1}^\infty \frac 1 n e^{-ns},$$

which converges at $s=-\pi i$ (alternating harmonic series) and diverges at $s=0$ (harmonic series). Thus, $\sigma=0$ is the line of convergence.

Suppose that a Dirichlet series does not converge at $s=0$, then it is clear that $\sigma_c\geq0$ and $\sum a_n$ diverges. On the other hand, if a Dirichlet series converges at $s=0$, then $\sigma_c\leq0$ and $\sum a_n$ converges. Thus, there are two formulas to compute $\sigma_c$, depending on the convergence of $\sum a_n$ which can be determined by various convergence tests. These formulas are similar to the Cauchy–Hadamard theorem for the radius of convergence of a power series.

If $\sum a_k$ is divergent, i.e. $\sigma_c\geq0$, then $\sigma_c$ is given by

$$\sigma_c=\limsup_{n\to\infty}\frac{\log|a_1+a_2+\cdots+a_n|}{\lambda_n}.$$

If $\sum a_k$ is convergent, i.e. $\sigma_c\leq0$, then $\sigma_c$ is given by

$$\sigma_c=\limsup_{n\to\infty}\frac{\log|a_{n+1}+a_{n+2}+\cdots|}{\lambda_n}.$$

== Abscissa of absolute convergence ==
A Dirichlet series is absolutely convergent if the series

$$\sum_{n=1}^\infty |a_n e^{-\lambda_n s}|,$$

is convergent. As usual, an absolutely convergent Dirichlet series is convergent, but the converse is not always true.

If a Dirichlet series is absolutely convergent at $s_0$, then it is absolutely convergent for all s where $\operatorname{Re}(s) > \operatorname{Re}(s_0)$. A Dirichlet series may converge absolutely for all, for no or for some values of s. In the latter case, there exist a $\sigma_a$ such that the series converges absolutely for $\sigma>\sigma_a$ and converges non-absolutely for $\sigma<\sigma_a$.

The abscissa of absolute convergence can be defined as $\sigma_a$ above, or equivalently as

$$\begin{align}
\sigma_a=\inf \Big\{\sigma\in\mathbb{R}:\sum_{n=1}^\infty a_n e^{-\lambda_n s} & \text{ converges absolutely for} \\
& \text{every } s \text{ for which} \operatorname{Re}(s)>\sigma\Big\}.
\end{align}$$

The line and half-plane of absolute convergence can be defined similarly. There are also two formulas to compute $\sigma_a$.

If $\sum |a_k|$ is divergent, then $\sigma_a$ is given by

$$\sigma_a=\limsup_{n\to\infty}\frac{\log(|a_1|+|a_2|+\cdots+|a_n|)}{\lambda_n}.$$

If $\sum |a_k|$ is convergent, then $\sigma_a$ is given by

$$\sigma_a=\limsup_{n\to\infty}\frac{\log(|a_{n+1}|+|a_{n+2}|+\cdots)}{\lambda_n}.$$

In general, the abscissa of convergence does not coincide with abscissa of absolute convergence. Thus, there might be a strip between the line of convergence and absolute convergence where a Dirichlet series is conditionally convergent. The width of this strip is given by

$$0\leq\sigma_a-\sigma_c\leq L:=\limsup_{n\to\infty}\frac{\log n}{\lambda_n}.$$

In the case where L = 0, then

$$\sigma_c=\sigma_a=\limsup_{n\to\infty}\frac{\log |a_n|}{\lambda_n}.$$

All the formulas provided so far still hold true for 'ordinary' Dirichlet series by substituting $\lambda_n=\log n$.

== Other abscissas of convergence ==
It is possible to consider other abscissas of convergence for a Dirichlet series. The abscissa of bounded convergence $\sigma_b$ is given by

$$\begin{align}
\sigma_b =\inf \Big\{\sigma\in\mathbb{R}:\sum_{n=1}^\infty a_n e^{-\lambda_n s} & \text{ is bounded in the half-plane } \operatorname{Re}(s) \geq \sigma\Big\},
\end{align}$$

while the abscissa of uniform convergence $\sigma_u$ is given by

$$\begin{align}
\sigma_u =\inf \Big\{\sigma\in\mathbb{R}:\sum_{n=1}^\infty a_n e^{-\lambda_n s} & \text{ converges uniformly in the half-plane } \operatorname{Re}(s) \geq \sigma\Big\}.
\end{align}$$

These abscissas are related to the abscissa of convergence $\sigma_c$ and of absolute convergence $\sigma_a$ by the formulas

$\sigma_c \leq \sigma_b \leq \sigma_u \leq \sigma_a$,

and a remarkable theorem of Bohr in fact shows that for any ordinary Dirichlet series where $\lambda_n = \ln(n)$ (i.e. Dirichlet series of the form $\sum_{n=1}^\infty a_n n^{-s}$), $\sigma_u = \sigma_b$ and $\sigma_a \leq \sigma_u + 1/2;$ Bohnenblust and Hille subsequently showed that for every number $d \in [0, 0.5]$ there are Dirichlet series $\sum_{n=1}^\infty a_n n^{-s}$ for which $\sigma_a - \sigma_u = d.$

A formula for the abscissa of uniform convergence $\sigma_u$ for the general Dirichlet series $\sum_{n=1}^\infty a_n e^{-\lambda_n s}$ is given as follows: for any $N \geq 1$, let $U_N = \sup_{t \in \R} \{ |\sum_{n=1}^N a_n e^{it\lambda_n}| \}$, then $\sigma_u = \lim_{N \rightarrow \infty}\frac{\log U_N}{\lambda_N}.$

== Analytic functions ==
A function represented by a Dirichlet series

$$f(s)=\sum_{n=1}^{\infty}a_n e^{-\lambda_n s},$$

is analytic on the half-plane of convergence. Moreover, for $k=1,2,3,\ldots$

$$f^{(k)}(s)=(-1)^k\sum_{n=1}^{\infty}a_n\lambda_n^k e^{-\lambda_n s}.$$

== Further generalizations ==
A Dirichlet series can be further generalized to the multi-variable case where $\lambda_n\in\mathbb{R}^k$, k = 2, 3, 4,..., or complex variable case where $\lambda_n\in\mathbb{C}^m$, m = 1, 2, 3,...
