= Poisson-Dirichlet distribution =

Definition and first properties of the Poisson-Dirichlet distributions

In probability theory, Poisson-Dirichlet distributions are probability distributions on the set of nonnegative, non-increasing sequences with sum 1, depending on two parameters $\alpha \in [0,1)$ and $\theta \in (-\alpha, \infty)$.

The Poisson-Dirichlet distribution can be defined as follows. Consider independent random variables $(Y_n)_{n \geq 1}$ such that $Y_n$ follows the beta distribution of parameters $1-\alpha$ and $\theta+n \alpha$. Then, the Poisson-Dirichlet distribution $PD(\alpha, \theta)$ of parameters $\alpha$ and $\theta$ is the law of the random decreasing sequence containing $Y_1$ and the products $Y_n \prod_{k=1}^{n-1}(1-Y_k)$.

This definition is due to Jim Pitman and Marc Yor. It generalizes Kingman's law, which corresponds to the particular case $\alpha = 0$.

== Applications ==
=== Pitman-Yor process ===
The values drawn from this distribution can be used as weights for sampling an infinite sequence of discrete items, an instance of a Pitman–Yor process. This is used to model the observation process of words, or species, etc. It is useful because it can generate phenomena with heavy-tailed distributions.

=== Number theory ===
Patrick Billingsley has proven the following result: if $n$ is a uniform random integer in $\{2,3,\dots,N\}$, if $k \geq 1$ is a fixed integer, and if $p_1 \geq p_2 \geq \dots \geq p_k$ are the $k$ largest prime divisors of $n$ (with $p_j$ arbitrarily defined if $n$ has less than $j$ prime factors), then the joint distribution of$(\log p_1/\log n, \log p_2/\log n, \dots, \log p_k/\log n)$converges to the law of the $k$ first elements of a $PD(0,1)$ distributed random sequence, when $N$ goes to infinity.

=== Random permutations and Ewens's sampling formula ===
The Poisson-Dirichlet distribution of parameters $\alpha = 0$ and $\theta = 1$ is also the limiting distribution, for $N$ going to infinity, of the sequence $(\ell_1/N, \ell_2/N, \ell_3/N, \dots)$, where $\ell_j$ is the length of the $j^{\operatorname{th}}$ largest cycle of a uniformly distributed permutation of order $N$. If for $\theta > 0$, one replaces the uniform distribution by the distribution $\mathbb{P}_{N, \theta}$ on $\mathfrak{S}_N$ such that $\mathbb{P}_{N, \theta} (\sigma) = \frac{\theta^{n(\sigma)}}{\theta (\theta+ 1) \dots (\theta + n(\sigma)-1)}$, where $n(\sigma)$ is the number of cycles of the permutation $\sigma$, then we get the Poisson-Dirichlet distribution of parameters $\alpha = 0$ and $\theta$. The probability distribution $\mathbb{P}_{N, \theta}$ is called Ewens's distribution, and comes from the Ewens's sampling formula, first introduced by Warren Ewens in population genetics, in order to describe the probabilities associated with counts of how many different alleles are observed a given number of times in the sample.

== See also ==
- Pitman–Yor process
