= Pólya urn model =

Random model in mathematics

In probability theory and statistics, a Pólya urn model (also known as a Pólya urn scheme or simply as Pólya's urn), named after George Pólya, is a family of urn models that can be used to interpret many commonly used statistical models.

The model represents objects of interest (such as atoms, people, cars, etc.) as colored balls in an urn. In the basic Pólya urn model, the experimenter puts x white and y black balls into an urn. At each step, one ball is drawn uniformly at random from the urn, and its color observed; it is then returned in the urn, and an additional ball of the same color is added to the urn.

If by random chance, more black balls are drawn than white balls in the initial few draws, it would make it more likely for more black balls to be drawn later, and the same for the white balls. Thus, the urn has a self-reinforcing property ("the rich get richer"). It is the opposite of sampling without replacement, where every time a particular value is observed, it is less likely to be observed again, whereas in a Pólya urn model, an observed value is more likely to be observed again. In a Pólya urn model, successive acts of measurement over time have less and less effect on future measurements, whereas in sampling without replacement, the opposite is true: After a certain number of measurements of a particular value, that value will never be seen again.

It is also different from sampling with replacement, where the ball is returned to the urn but without adding new balls. In this case, there is neither self-reinforcing nor anti-self-reinforcing.

== Basic results ==
Questions of interest are the evolution of the urn population and the sequence of colors of the balls drawn out.

After $n$ draws, the probability that the urn contains $(x+n_1)$ white balls and $(y+n_2)$ black balls (for $0 \le n_1 , n_2 \le n \,\,, n_1 + n_2 = n$) is
$$\binom{n}{n_1}\frac{x^{\bar n_1}y^{\bar n_2}}{(x+y)^{\bar n}}$$
where the overbar denotes rising factorial. This can be proved by drawing the Pascal's triangle of all possible configurations.

In particular, starting with one white and one black ball (i.e., $x = y = 1$) the probability to have any number $1 \le n_1 + 1 \le n+1$ of white balls in the urn after $n$ draws is the same, $\frac{1}{n+1}$.

More generally, if the urn starts with $a_i$ balls of color $i$, with $i = 1, 2, ..., k$, then after $n$ draws, the probability that the urn contains $(a_i+n_i)$ balls of color $i$ is
$$\binom{n}{n_1, \cdots, n_k}\frac{\prod_{i=1}^k a_i^{\bar n_i}}{(\sum_i a_i)^{\bar n}}$$
where we use the multinomial coefficient.

Conditional on the urn ending up with $(a_i+n_i)$ balls of color $i$ after $n$ draws, there are $\binom{n}{n_1, \cdots, n_k}$ different trajectories that could have led to such an end-state. The conditional probability of each trajectory is the same: $\binom{n}{n_1, \cdots, n_k}^{-1}$.

== Distributions related to the Pólya urn ==
- Beta-binomial distribution: The distribution of the number of successful draws (trials), e.g. number of extractions of white ball, given $n$ draws from a Pólya urn.
- Beta negative binomial distribution: The distribution of number of white balls observed until a fixed number black balls are observed.
- Dirichlet-multinomial distribution (also known as the multivariate Pólya distribution): The distribution over the number of balls of each color, given $n$ draws from a Pólya urn where there are $k$ different colors instead of only two.
- Dirichlet negative multinomial distribution: The distribution over the number of balls of each color until a fixed number of stopping colored balls are observed.
- Martingales, the Beta-binomial distribution and the beta distribution: Let w and b be the number of white and black balls initially in the urn, and $w+n_w$ the number of white balls currently in the urn after n draws. Then the sequence of values $\frac{w+n_w}{w+b+n}$ for $n=1,2,3,\dots$ is a normalized version of the Beta-binomial distribution. It is a martingale and converges to the beta distribution when n → ∞.
- Dirichlet process, Chinese restaurant process, Hoppe urn: Imagine a modified Pólya urn scheme as follows. We start with an urn with $\alpha$ black balls. When drawing a ball from the urn, if we draw a black ball, put the ball back along with a new ball of a new non-black color randomly generated from a uniform distribution over an infinite set of available colours, and consider the newly generated color to be the "value" of the draw. Otherwise, put the ball back along with another ball of the same color, as for the standard Pólya urn scheme. The colors of an infinite sequence of draws from this modified Pólya urn scheme follow a Chinese restaurant process. If, instead of generating a new color, we draw a random value from a given base distribution and use that value to label the ball, the labels of an infinite sequence of draws follow a Dirichlet process.
- Moran model: An urn model used to model genetic drift in theoretical population genetics. This is closely similar to the Pólya urn model except that, in addition to adding a new ball of the same color, a randomly drawn ball is removed from the urn. The number of balls in the urn thus remains constant. Continued sampling then leads ultimately to an urn with all balls of one color, the probability of each color being the proportion of that color in the original urn. There are variants of the Moran model that insist that the ball removed from the urn be a different ball from one originally sampled in that step, and variants that do the removal of a ball immediately after the new ball is placed in the urn, so that the new ball is one of the balls available to be removed. This makes a small difference in the time taken to reach the state in which all balls are the same color. The Moran process models genetic drift in a population with overlapping generations.

== Exchangeability ==
Polya's Urn is a quintessential example of an exchangeable process.

Suppose we have an urn containing $\gamma$ white balls and $\alpha$ black balls. We proceed to draw balls at random from the urn. On the $i$-th draw, we define a random variable, $X_i$, by $X_i = 1$ if the ball is black and $X_i = 0$ otherwise. We then return the ball to the urn, with an additional ball of the same colour. For a given $i$, if we have that $X_j = 1$ for many $j < i$, then it is more likely that $X_i =1$, because more black balls have been added to the urn. Therefore, these variables are not independent of each other.

The sequence $X_1, X_2, X_3, \dots$ does, however, exhibit the weaker property of exchangeability. Recall that a (finite or infinite) sequence of random variables is called exchangeable if its joint distribution is invariant under permutations of indices.

To show exchangeability of the sequence $X_1, X_2, X_3, \dots$, assume that $n$ balls are picked from the urn, and out of these $n$ balls, $k$ balls are black and $n-k$ are white. On the first draw the number of balls in the urn is $\gamma+\alpha$; on the second draw it is $\gamma+\alpha+1$ and so on. On the $i$-th draw, the number of balls will be $\gamma+\alpha+i-1$. The probability that we draw all $k$ black balls first, and then all $n-k$ white balls is given by

$\mathbb P \left( X_1 = 1, \dots, X_k =1, X_{k+1} =0, \dots, X_n = 0 \right)$$= \frac{\alpha}{\gamma+\alpha}\times \frac{\alpha+1}{\gamma+\alpha+1}\times \cdots \times \frac{\alpha+k-1}{\gamma+\alpha+k-1} \times \frac{\gamma}{\gamma+\alpha+k}\times \frac{\gamma+1}{\gamma+\alpha+k+1}\times \cdots \times \frac{\gamma+n-k-1}{\gamma+\alpha+n-1}$

Now we must show that if the order of black and white balls is permuted, there is no change to the probability. As in the expression above, even after permuting the draws, the $i$th denominator will always be $\gamma+\alpha+i-1$, since this is the number of balls in the urn at that round.

If we see $j$-th black ball in round $t$, the probability $X_t = 1$ will be equal to $\frac{\alpha+j-1}{\gamma+\alpha+t-1}$, i.e. the numerator will be equal to $\alpha+j-1$. With the same argument, we can calculate the probability for white balls. Therefore, for any sequence $x_1, x_2, x_3, \dots$ in which $1$ occurs $k$ times and $0$ occurs $n-k$ times (i.e. a sequence with $k$ black balls and $n-k$ white balls drawn in some order) the final probability will be equal to the following expression, where we take advantage of commutativity of multiplication in the numerator:
$$\begin{align}
\mathbb P(X_1=x_1,X_2=x_2,...,X_n=x_n) &=
\frac{\prod_{i=1}^k \left(\alpha+i-1\right)\times \prod_{i=1}^{n-k} \left(\gamma+i-1\right)}{\prod_{i=1}^{n}\left(\gamma+\alpha+i-1\right)} \\
&= \frac{\left(\alpha+k-1\right)!\times \left(\gamma+n-k-1\right)!\times \left(\alpha+\gamma-1\right)!}{\left(\alpha-1\right)!\times \left(\gamma-1\right)!\left(\alpha+\gamma+n-1\right)!}
\end{align}$$
This probability is not related to the order of seeing black and white balls and only depends on the total number of white balls and the total number of black balls.

According to the De Finetti's theorem, there must be a unique prior distribution such that the joint distribution of observing the sequence is a Bayesian mixture of the Bernoulli probabilities. It can be shown that this prior distribution is a beta distribution with parameters $\beta\left(\cdot; \,\alpha,\, \gamma\right)$. In De Finetti's theorem, if we replace $\pi(\cdot)$ with $\beta\left(\cdot; \,\alpha,\, \gamma\right)$, then we get the previous equation:
$$\begin{align}
p(X_1=x_1,X_2=x_2,...,X_n=x_n) &= \int \theta^\left({\sum_{i=1}^n x_i}\right)\times \left(1-\theta\right)^\left(n - {\sum_{i=1}^n x_i}\right)\,\beta\left(\theta; \alpha,\, \gamma\right)d\left(\theta\right)\\
&= \int \theta^\left({\sum_{i=1}^n x_i}\right)\times \left(1-\theta\right)^\left(n - {\sum_{i=1}^n x_i}\right)\,\dfrac{(\alpha+\gamma-1)!}{(\alpha-1)!\,(\gamma-1)!}\theta^{\alpha-1}(1-\theta)^{\gamma-1}d\left(\theta\right)\\
&= \int \theta^\left({\alpha -1 +\sum_{i=1}^n x_i}\right)\times \left(1-\theta\right)^\left(n + \gamma -1 -{\sum_{i=1}^n x_i}\right)\,\dfrac{(\alpha+\gamma-1)!}{(\alpha-1)!\,(\gamma-1)!}d\left(\theta\right)\\
&= \int \theta^\left({\alpha + k - 1}\right)\times \left(1-\theta\right)^\left(n -k - 1+ \gamma\right)\,\dfrac{(\alpha+\gamma-1)!}{(\alpha-1)!\,(\gamma-1)!}d\left(\theta\right)\\
&= \dfrac{(\alpha+\gamma-1)!}{(\alpha-1)!\,(\gamma-1)!} \int \theta^\left({\alpha + k - 1}\right)\times \left(1-\theta\right)^\left(n-k+\gamma- 1\right)\,d\left(\theta\right)\\
&= \dfrac{(\alpha+\gamma-1)!}{(\alpha-1)!\,(\gamma-1)!} \dfrac{\Gamma(\gamma+n-k)\Gamma(\alpha+k)}{\Gamma(\alpha+\gamma+n)}\\
&= \dfrac{\left(\alpha+k-1\right)!\times \left(\gamma+n-k-1\right)!\times \left(\alpha+\gamma-1\right)!}{\left(\alpha-1\right)!\times \left(\gamma-1\right)!\left(\alpha+\gamma+n-1\right)!}
\end{align}$$
In this equation $k = \sum_{i=1}^n x_i$.

== See also ==
- Urn problem
- Pitman–Yor process
- Moran process
- Yule process
- De Finetti's theorem
- Chinese restaurant process

== Bibliography ==
- N.L. Johnson and S.Kotz, (1977) "Urn Models and Their Application." John Wiley.
- Hosam Mahmoud, (2008) "Pólya Urn Models." Chapman and Hall/CRC. ISBN 978-1420059830.
