= Generalized Pochhammer symbol =

In mathematics, the generalized Pochhammer symbol of parameter $\alpha>0$ and partition $\kappa=(\kappa_1,\kappa_2,\ldots,\kappa_m)$, named after Leo August Pochhammer, generalizes the classical Pochhammer symbol. It is defined as

$$(a)^{(\alpha )}_\kappa=\prod_{i=1}^m \prod_{j=1}^{\kappa_i}
\left(a-\frac{i-1}{\alpha}+j-1\right).$$

The generalized Pochhammer symbol is used in multivariate analysis.
