= Leo August Pochhammer =

Leo August Pochhammer (25 August 1841, Stendal – 24 March 1920, Kiel) was a Prussian mathematician who was known for his work on special functions and introduced the Pochhammer symbol, now generally used for expressing hypergeometric functions in a compact notation.

== Life ==
Pochhammer was born in Stendal, but grew up in Berlin.

He studied mathematics and physics at the Friedrich Wilhelm University in Berlin from 1859 to 1863. He received his doctorate in 1863 from Ernst Eduard Kummer. A period of habilitation followed in 1872. For the next two years he was a lecturer in Berlin.

In 1874 he became Professor at the Christian Albrechts University in Kiel. After the Mathematical Seminar was founded at the same university in 1877, a second chair for mathematics was established with the appointment of Pochhammer as full professor. On 22 May 1877, regulations for the mathematical seminar at the Royal University in Kiel were issued. Along with the German mathematician and astronomer Georg Daniel Eduard Weyer, Pochhammer was appointed one of the directors of the seminar.

In the years 1893/94 he was rector of the university. In his rectorate speech on March 6, 1893, he made a "contribution to the question of university studies for women". He advocated offering women and girls more educational opportunities as at that time women were not allowed to enter university in Germany, but largely denied their aptitude and interest in university studies. Therefore, in his opinion, women's colleges with simplified entry requirements should be created and women should be given the opportunity, for example, "to train to become second-class doctors."

In 1895 he was promoted to "Geheimer Regierungsrat", an unpaid governor position and a title of honour. From 1876 to 1914 he taught part-time at the Naval Academy and School (Kiel). He died just a few months after his retirement in 1919. Successor to the second chair was Otto Toeplitz.

== See also ==
- Pochhammer symbol
- Generalized Pochhammer symbol
- q-Pochhammer symbol
- Pochhammer contour
- Falling and rising factorials
