= Jim Pitman =

Emeritus Professor of Statistics and Mathematics

Jim Pitman is a professor emeritus of statistics and mathematics at the University of California, Berkeley.

== Biography ==
Jim Pitman (James W. Pitman) was born in Hobart, Australia, in June 1949, son of E. J. G. Pitman and Elinor J. Pitman, daughter of W. N. T. Hurst. He attended the Hutchins School, Hobart, Australia from 1954 to 1966, then the Australian National University (ANU) in Canberra, from 1967 to 1970. He received a BSc degree from the ANU in 1970, followed by a PhD in probability and statistics in 1974 from the University of Sheffield, with advisor Terry Speed. He lectured at the Universities of Copenhagen, Berkeley and Cambridge, from 1974 to 1978, before joining Berkeley as an assistant professor in 1978. Following promotion to professor in 1984, he retired from teaching duties at Berkeley in July 2021. He is now emeritus professor of statistics and mathematics at the University of California, Berkeley.

Pitman is a Fellow of the Institute of Mathematical Statistics, and is a past president (2007) of the institute.

He was chief editor (1994—1996) of Annals of Probability.

== Scientific work ==
Pitman is known for his research in the theory of probability, stochastic processes and enumerative combinatorics. In particular, for long-running collaborations with Marc Yor on distributional properties of Brownian motion and Bessel processes, and with David Aldous on the asymptotics of random combinatorial structures and models for continuum random trees.

With Lester Dubins, Pitman introduced the metaphor of the Chinese Restaurant Process for the scheme of adding new elements to a permutation by their insertion into previously formed cycles. His deeper study of this model, and its surprising relation with the theory of Brownian excursions led to the Pitman-Yor process as a model for random discrete distributions, and to generalizations of the Ewens's sampling formula including the Ewens-Pitman sampling formula.

Much of his research is surveyed in his influential 2002 work, published as lecture notes at the Ecole d'Eté de Probabilités de Saint-Flour XXXII.

In combinatorics, he is known for his elementary proof of Cayley's formula computing the number of spanning trees in a complete graph. This proof involving a double counting argument is noted for its elegance and appears in the book Proofs from THE BOOK.

== Publications ==
Pitman has published over 170 articles in mathematical journals. Among the most influential are:

- Pitman, James W. (1975). "One-dimensional Brownian motion and the three-dimensional Bessel process". Advances in Applied Probability. 7 (3): 511–526. doi:10.2307/1426125. ISSN 0001-8678.
- "Pitman's theorem" commonly refers to Pitman's 1974 result that if $B$ is a standard one dimensional Brownian motion started at $B_0 = 0$, and $M_t = \max_{0 \le s \le t } B_s$, then $2M - B$ has the same distribution as $BES(3)$, the Bessel process which is the radial part of a 3-dimensional Brownian motion.
- Perman, Mihael; Pitman, Jim; Yor, Marc (1992-03-01). "Size-biased sampling of Poisson point processes and excursions". Probability Theory and Related Fields. 92 (1): 21–39. doi:10.1007/BF01205234. ISSN 1432-2064.
- Pitman, Jim (1995-06-01). "Exchangeable and partially exchangeable random partitions". Probability Theory and Related Fields. 102 (2): 145–158. doi:10.1007/BF01213386. ISSN 1432-2064.
- Pitman, Jim; Yor, Marc (1997-04-01). "The two-parameter Poisson-Dirichlet distribution derived from a stable subordinator". The Annals of Probability. 25 (2). doi:10.1214/aop/1024404422. ISSN 0091-1798.
- Pitman, Jim (1993). Probability. Springer. doi:10.1007/978-1-4612-4374-8. ISBN 0-387-97974-3.
