= Pochhammer contour =

Contour in the complex plane

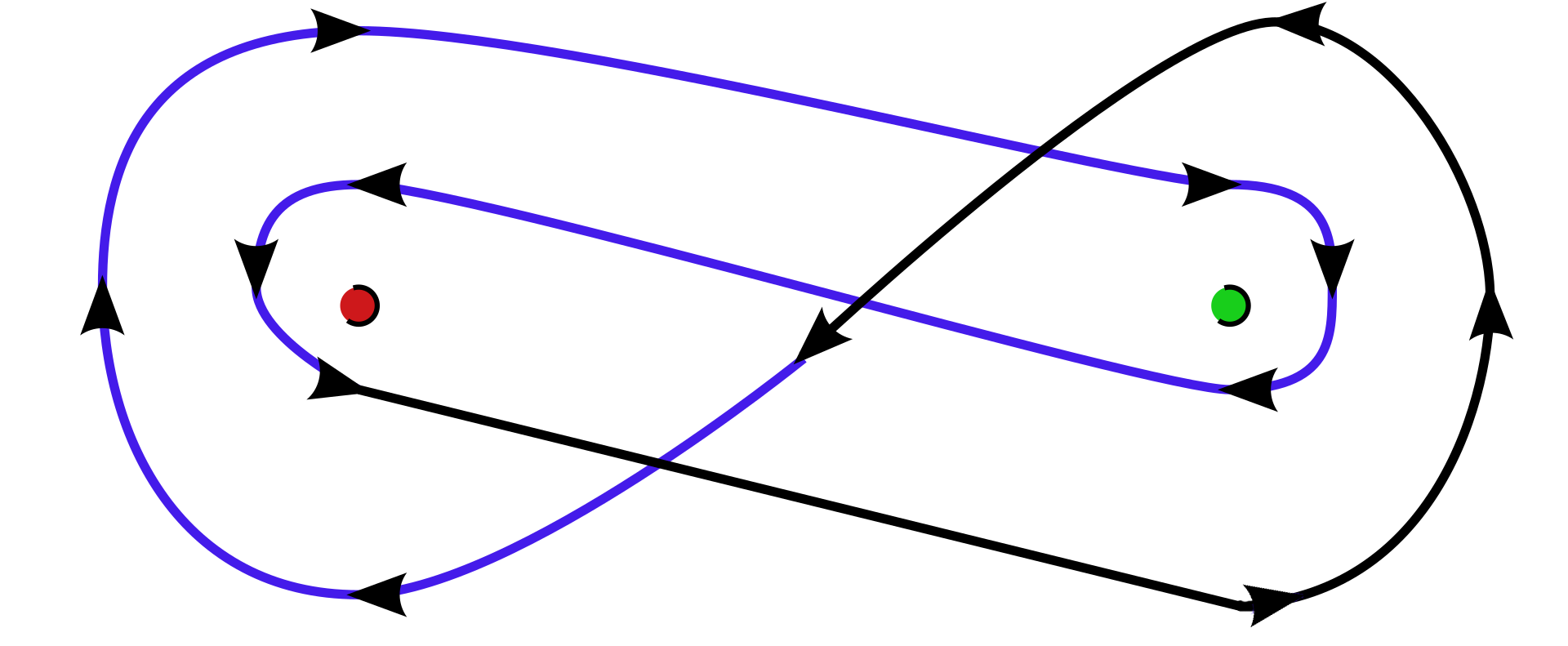
A Pochhammer contour winds clockwise around one point, then clockwise around another point, then counterclockwise around the first point, then counterclockwise around the second. The exact position, curvature, etc. are in this case not essential; the sequence of windings around the two special points is.

In mathematics, the Pochhammer contour, introduced by Camille Jordan (1887) and Leo Pochhammer (1890), is a contour in the complex plane with two points removed, used for contour integration. If A and B are loops around the two points, both starting at some fixed point P, then the Pochhammer contour is the commutator ABA^{−1}B^{−1}, where the superscript −1 denotes a path taken in the opposite direction. With the two points taken as 0 and 1, the fixed basepoint P being on the real axis between them, an example is the path that starts at P, encircles the point 1 in the counter-clockwise direction and returns to P, then encircles 0 counter-clockwise and returns to P, after that circling 1 and then 0 clockwise, before coming back to P. The class of the contour is an actual commutator when it is considered in the fundamental group with basepoint P of the complement in the complex plane (or Riemann sphere) of the two points looped. When it comes to taking contour integrals, moving basepoint from P to another choice Q makes no difference to the result, since there will be cancellation of integrals from P to Q and back.

== Homologous to zero but not homotopic to zero ==
Within the doubly punctured plane this curve is homologous to zero but not homotopic to zero. Its winding number about any point is 0 despite the fact that within the doubly punctured plane it cannot be shrunk to a single point.

Pochhammer cycle is homologous to zero: it is the boundary of the green area minus the boundary of the red one.

== Applications ==
The beta function is given by Euler's integral

$$\displaystyle \Beta(\alpha,\beta)=\int_0^1 t^{\alpha-1}(1-t)^{\beta-1} \, dt$$

provided that the real parts of α and β are positive, which may be converted into an integral over the Pochhammer contour C as

$$\displaystyle (1-e^{2\pi i\alpha})(1-e^{2\pi i\beta})\Beta(\alpha,\beta) =\int_C t^{\alpha-1}(1-t)^{\beta-1} \, dt.$$

The contour integral converges for all values of α and β and so gives the analytic continuation of the beta function. A similar method can be applied to Euler's integral for the hypergeometric function to give its analytic continuation.
