= Pochhammer k-symbol =

Term in the mathematical theory of special functions

In the mathematical theory of special functions, the Pochhammer k-symbol and the k-gamma function, introduced by Rafael Díaz and Eddy Pariguan are generalizations of the Pochhammer symbol and gamma function. They differ from the Pochhammer symbol and gamma function in that they can be related to a general arithmetic progression in the same manner as those are related to the sequence of consecutive integers.

== Definition ==
The Pochhammer k-symbol (x)_{n,k} is defined as

$$\begin{align}
(x)_{n,k} & = x(x + k)(x + 2k) \cdots (x + (n-1)k)=\prod_{i=1}^n (x+(i-1)k) \\
& = k^n \times \left(\frac{x}{k}\right)_n,\,
\end{align}$$

and the k-gamma function Γ_{k}, with k > 0, is defined as

$$\Gamma_k(x) = \lim_{n\to\infty} \frac{n!k^n (nk)^{x/k - 1}}{(x)_{n,k}}.$$

When k = 1 the standard Pochhammer symbol and gamma function are obtained.

Díaz and Pariguan use these definitions to demonstrate a number of properties of the hypergeometric function. Although Díaz and Pariguan restrict these symbols to k > 0, the Pochhammer k-symbol as they define it is well-defined for all real k, and for negative k gives the falling factorial, while for k = 0 it reduces to the power x^{n}.

The Díaz and Pariguan paper does not address the many analogies between the Pochhammer k-symbol and the power function, such as the fact that the binomial theorem can be extended to Pochhammer k-symbols. It is true, however, that many equations involving the power function x^{n} continue to hold when x^{n} is replaced by (x)_{n,k}.

== Continued Fractions, Congruences, and Finite Difference Equations ==
Jacobi-type J-fractions for the ordinary generating function of the Pochhammer k-symbol, denoted in slightly different notation by $p_n(\alpha, R) := R(R+\alpha)\cdots(R+(n-1)\alpha)$ for fixed $\alpha > 0$ and some indeterminate parameter $R$, are considered in in the form of the next infinite continued fraction expansion given by

$$\begin{align}
\text{Conv}_h(\alpha, R; z) & :=
\cfrac{1}{1 - R \cdot z -
\cfrac{\alpha R \cdot z^2}{
1 - (R+2\alpha) \cdot z -
\cfrac{2\alpha (R + \alpha) \cdot z^2}{
1 - (R + 4\alpha) \cdot z -
\cfrac{3\alpha (R + 2\alpha) \cdot z^2}{
\cdots}}}}.
\end{align}$$

The rational $h^{th}$ convergent function, $\text{Conv}_h(\alpha, R; z)$, to the full generating function for these products expanded by the last equation is given by

$$\begin{align}
\text{Conv}_h(\alpha, R; z) & :=
\cfrac{1}{1 - R \cdot z -
\cfrac{\alpha R \cdot z^2}{
1 - (R+2\alpha) \cdot z -
\cfrac{2\alpha (R + \alpha) \cdot z^2}{
1 - (R + 4\alpha) \cdot z -
\cfrac{3\alpha (R + 2\alpha) \cdot z^2}{
\cfrac{\cdots}{1 - (R + 2 (h-1) \alpha) \cdot z}}}}} \\
& =
\frac{\text{FP}_h(\alpha, R; z)}{\text{FQ}_h(\alpha, R; z)} =
\sum_{n=0}^{2h-1} p_n(\alpha, R) z^n +
\sum_{n=2h}^{\infty} \widetilde{e}_{h,n}(\alpha, R) z^n,
\end{align}$$

where the component convergent function sequences, $\text{FP}_h(\alpha, R; z)$ and $\text{FQ}_h(\alpha, R; z)$, are given as closed-form sums in terms of the ordinary Pochhammer symbol and the Laguerre polynomials by

$$\begin{align}
\text{FP}_h(\alpha, R; z) & = \sum_{n=0}^{h-1}\left[\sum_{i=0}^n \binom{h}{i} (1-h-R/\alpha)_i (R/\alpha)_{n-i}\right] (\alpha z)^n \\
\text{FQ}_h(\alpha, R; z) & = \sum_{i=0}^h \binom{h}{i} (R/\alpha+h-i)_i(-\alpha z)^i \\
& = (-\alpha z)^h \cdot h! \cdot L_h^{(R/\alpha-1)}\left((\alpha z)^{-1}\right).
\end{align}$$

The rationality of the $h^{th}$ convergent functions for all $h \geq 2$, combined with known enumerative properties of the J-fraction expansions, imply the following finite difference equations both exactly generating $(x)_{n,\alpha}$ for all $n \geq 1$, and generating the symbol modulo $h \alpha^t$ for some fixed integer $0 \leq t \leq h$:

$$\begin{align}
(x)_{n,\alpha} & = \sum_{0 \leq k < n} \binom{n}{k+1} (-1)^k (x+(n-1)\alpha)_{k+1,-\alpha} (x)_{n-1-k,\alpha} \\
(x)_{n,\alpha} & \equiv \sum_{0 \leq k \leq n} \binom{h}{k} \alpha^{n+(t+1)k} (1-h-x/\alpha)_k (x/\alpha)_{n-k} && \pmod{h \alpha^t}.
\end{align}$$

The rationality of $\text{Conv}_h(\alpha, R; z)$ also implies the next exact expansions of these products given by

$$(x)_{n,\alpha} = \sum_{j=1}^h c_{h,j}(\alpha, x) \times \ell_{h,j}(\alpha, x)^n,$$

where the formula is expanded in terms of the special zeros of the Laguerre polynomials, or equivalently, of the confluent hypergeometric function, defined as the finite (ordered) set

$$\left(\ell_{h,j}(\alpha, x)\right)_{j=1}^h = \left\{ z_j : \alpha^h \times U\left(-h, \frac{x}{\alpha}, \frac{z}{\alpha}\right) = 0,\ 1 \leq j \leq h \right\},$$

and where $\text{Conv}_h(\alpha, R; z) := \sum_{j=1}^h c_{h,j}(\alpha, x) / (1-\ell_{h,j}(\alpha, x))$ denotes the partial fraction decomposition of the rational $h^{th}$ convergent function.

Additionally, since the denominator convergent functions, $\text{FQ}_h(\alpha, R; z)$, are expanded exactly through the Laguerre polynomials as above, we can exactly generate the Pochhammer k-symbol as the series coefficients

$$(x)_{n,\alpha} = \alpha^n \cdot [w^n]\left(\sum_{i=0}^{n+n_0-1} \binom{\frac{x}{\alpha}+i-1}{i} \times \frac{(-1/w)}{(i+1) L_i^{(x/\alpha-1)}(1/w) L_{i+1}^{(x/\alpha-1)}(1/w)}\right),$$

for any prescribed integer $n_0 \geq 0$.

== Special Cases ==
Special cases of the Pochhammer k-symbol, $(x)_{n,k}$, correspond to the following special cases of the falling and rising factorials, including the Pochhammer symbol, and the generalized cases of the multiple factorial functions (multifactorial functions), or the $\alpha$-factorial functions studied in the last two references by Schmidt:

- The Pochhammer symbol, or rising factorial function: $(x)_{n,1} \equiv (x)_n$
- The falling factorial function: $(x)_{n,-1} \equiv x^{\underline{n}}$
- The single factorial function: $n! = (1)_{n,1} = (n)_{n,-1}$
- The double factorial function: $(2n-1)!! = (1)_{n,2} = (2n-1)_{n,-2}$
- The multifactorial functions defined recursively by $n!_{(\alpha)} = n \cdot (n-\alpha)!_{(\alpha)}$ for $\alpha \in \mathbb{Z}^{+}$ and some offset $0 \leq d < \alpha$: $(\alpha n-d)!_{(\alpha)} = (\alpha-d)_{n,\alpha} = (\alpha n-d)_{n,-\alpha}$ and $n!_{(\alpha)} = (n)_{\lfloor (n+\alpha-1) / \alpha \rfloor,-\alpha}$

The expansions of these k-symbol-related products considered termwise with respect to the coefficients of the powers of $x^k$ ($1 \leq k \leq n$) for each finite $n \geq 1$ are defined in the article on generalized Stirling numbers of the first kind and generalized Stirling (convolution) polynomials in.
