= Pitman–Yor process =

Stochastic process in probability theory

In probability theory, a Pitman–Yor process denoted PY(d, θ, G_{0}), is a stochastic process whose sample path is a probability distribution. A random sample from this process is an infinite discrete probability distribution, consisting of an infinite set of atoms drawn from G_{0}, with weights drawn from a two-parameter Poisson-Dirichlet distribution. The process is named after Jim Pitman and Marc Yor.

The parameters governing the Pitman–Yor process are: 0 ≤ d < 1 a discount parameter, a strength parameter θ > −d and a base distribution G_{0} over a probability space X. When d = 0, it becomes the Dirichlet process. The discount parameter gives the Pitman–Yor process more flexibility over tail behavior than the Dirichlet process, which has exponential tails. This makes Pitman–Yor process useful for modeling data with power-law tails (e.g., word frequencies in natural language).

The exchangeable random partition induced by the Pitman–Yor process is an example of a Chinese restaurant process, a Poisson–Kingman partition, and of a Gibbs type random partition.

The Pitman-Yor process is used to model the observation process of words, or species, etc. It is useful because it can generate phenomena with heavy-tailed distributions.

== Naming conventions ==
The name "Pitman–Yor process" was coined by Ishwaran and James after Pitman and Yor's review on the subject. However the process was originally studied in Perman et al.

It is also sometimes referred to as the two-parameter Poisson–Dirichlet process, after the two-parameter generalization of the Poisson–Dirichlet distribution which describes the joint distribution of the sizes of the atoms in the random measure, sorted by strictly decreasing order.

== See also ==
- Chinese restaurant process
- Dirichlet distribution
- Latent Dirichlet allocation
