= Ewens's sampling formula =

Sampling formula which describes the probabilities of alleles in a sample

In population genetics, Ewens's sampling formula describes the probabilities associated with counts of how many different alleles are observed a given number of times in the sample.

== Definition ==
Ewens's sampling formula, introduced by Warren Ewens, states that under certain conditions (specified below), if a random sample of n gametes is taken from a population and classified according to the gene at a particular locus then the probability that there are a_{1} alleles represented once in the sample, and a_{2} alleles represented twice, and so on, is

$$\operatorname{Pr}(a_1,\dots,a_n; \theta)={n! \over \theta(\theta+1)\cdots(\theta+n-1)}\prod_{j=1}^n{\theta^{a_j} \over j^{a_j} a_j!},$$

for some positive number θ representing the population mutation rate, whenever $a_1, \ldots, a_n$ is a sequence of nonnegative integers such that

$$a_1+2a_2+3a_3+\cdots+na_n=\sum_{i=1}^{n} i a_i = n.\,$$

The phrase "under certain conditions" used above is made precise by the following assumptions:

- The sample size n is small by comparison to the size of the whole population; and
- The population is in statistical equilibrium under mutation and genetic drift and the role of selection at the locus in question is negligible; and
- Every mutant allele is novel.

This is a probability distribution on the set of all partitions of the integer n. Among probabilists and statisticians it is often called the multivariate Ewens distribution.

== Mathematical properties ==
When θ = 0, the probability is 1 that all n genes are the same. When θ = 1, then the distribution is precisely that of the integer partition induced by a uniformly distributed random permutation. As θ → ∞, the probability that no two of the n genes are the same approaches 1.

This family of probability distributions enjoys the property that if after the sample of n is taken, m of the n gametes are chosen without replacement, then the resulting probability distribution on the set of all partitions of the smaller integer m is just what the formula above would give if m were put in place of n.

The Ewens distribution arises naturally from the Chinese restaurant process.

== See also ==
- Chinese restaurant table distribution
- Coalescent theory
- Unified neutral theory of biodiversity
- Biomathematics

== Notes ==
- Ewens, Warren (1972). "The sampling theory of selectively neutral alleles". Theoretical Population Biology. 3: 87–112. doi:10.1016/0040-5809(72)90035-4.
- H. Crane. (2016) "The Ubiquitous Ewens Sampling Formula", Statistical Science, 31:1 (Feb 2016). This article introduces a series of seven articles about Ewens Sampling in a special issue of the journal.
- Kingman, J. F. C. (1978). "Random partitions in population genetics". Proceedings of the Royal Society of London. Series B, Mathematical and Physical Sciences. 361 (1704). doi:10.1098/rspa.1978.0089.
- Tavare, S.; Ewens, W. J. (1997). "The Multivariate Ewens distribution". In Johnson, N. L.; Kotz, S.; Balakrishnan, N. (eds.). Discrete Multivariate Distributions. Wiley. pp. 232–246. ISBN 0-471-12844-9.
