= Keno =

Game of chance

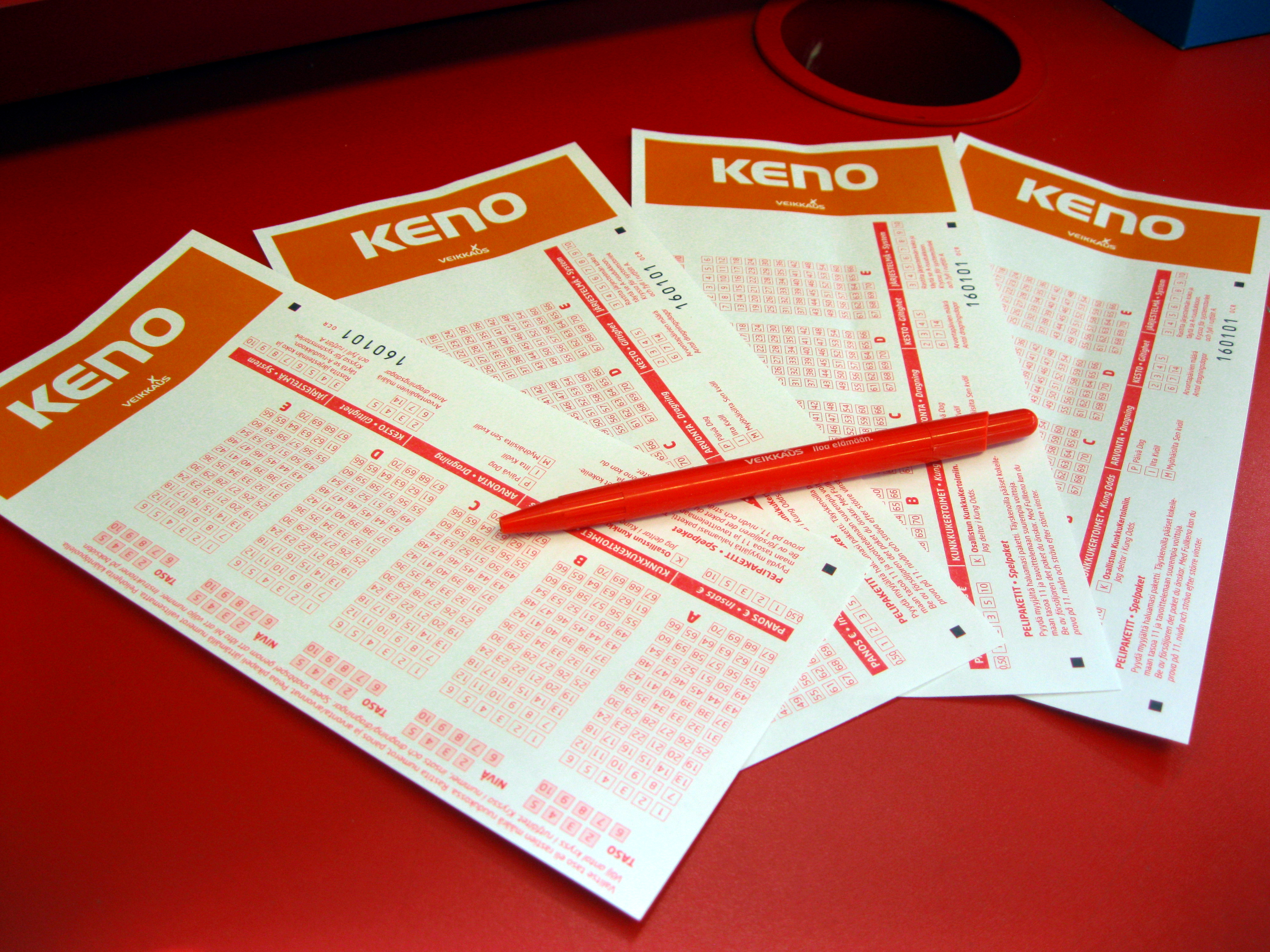
A set of Finnish keno betting slips

Keno /kiːnoʊ/ is a lottery-like gambling game often played at modern casinos, and also offered as a game in some lotteries.

Players wager by choosing numbers ranging from 1 through (usually) 80. After all players make their wagers, 20 numbers (some variants draw fewer numbers) are drawn at random, either with a ball machine similar to ones used for lotteries and bingo, or with a random number generator.

Each casino sets its own series of payouts, called "paytables". The player is paid based on how many numbers were chosen (either player selection, or the terminal picking the numbers), the number of matches out of those chosen, and the wager.

There are a wide variety of keno paytables depending on the casino, usually with a larger "house edge" than other games, ranging from less than 4 percent to over 35 percent in online play, and 20–40% in in-person casinos. By way of comparison, the typical house edge for non-slot casino games is under 5%.

== History ==
The word "keno" has French or Latin roots (Fr. quine "five winning numbers", L. quini "five each"), but by all accounts the game originated in China. Legend has it that Zhang Liang invented the game during the Chu-Han Contention to raise money to defend an ancient city, and its widespread popularity later helped raise funds to build the Great Wall of China. In modern China, the idea of using lotteries to fund a public institution was not accepted before the late 19th century.

Chinese lottery is not documented before 1847, when the Portuguese government of Macao decided to grant a licence to lottery operators. According to some, results of keno games in great cities were sent to outlying villages and hamlets by carrier pigeons, resulting in its Chinese name 白鸽票 báigē piào, with the literal reading "white dove tickets" in Mandarin, but in Southern varieties of Chinese spoken in Guangdong simply meaning "pigeon tickets", and pronounced baak^{6}-gaap^{3}-piu^{3} in Cantonese (on which the Western spelling 'pak-ah-pu' / 'pakapoo' was based).

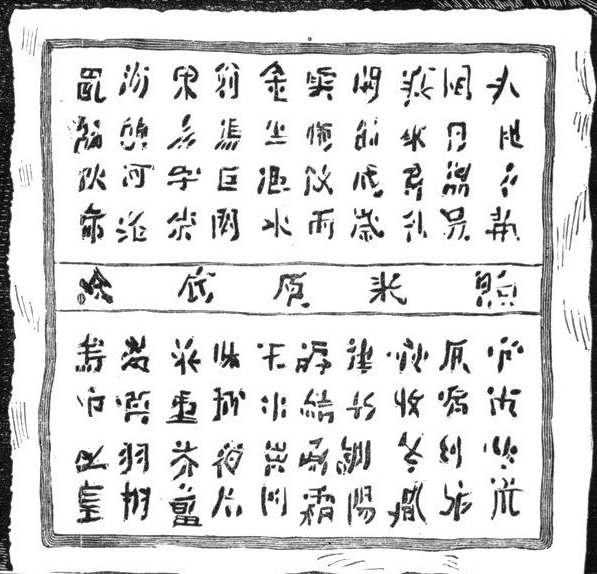
1876 Australian illustration of a pakapoo ticket

The Chinese played the game using sheets printed with Chinese characters, often the first 80 characters of the Thousand Character Classic, from which the winning characters were selected. Eventually, Chinese immigrants introduced keno to the West when they sailed across the Pacific Ocean to work on construction of the First transcontinental railroad in the 19th century, where the name was Westernized into boc hop bu and puck-apu. There were also other, earlier games called Keno, but these were played in the same way as the game now known as "Bingo", not the modern game of Keno.

== Probabilities ==
Keno payouts are based on how many numbers the player chooses and how many of those numbers are "hit", multiplied by the proportion of the player's original wager to the "base rate" of the paytable. Typically, the more numbers a player chooses and the more numbers hit, the greater the payout, although some paytables pay for hitting a lesser number of spots. For example, it is not uncommon to see casinos paying $500 or even $1,000 for a "catch" of 0 out of 20 on a 20 spot ticket with a $5.00 wager. Payouts vary widely by casino. Most casinos allow paytable wagers of 1 through 20 numbers, but some limit the choice to only 1 through 10, 12 and 15 numbers, or "spots" as keno aficionados call the numbers selected.

The probability of a player hitting all 20 numbers on a 20 spot ticket is approximately 1 in 3.5 quintillion (1 in 3,535,316,142,212,174,320).

Even though it is highly improbable to hit all 20 numbers on a 20 spot ticket, the same player would typically also get paid for hitting "catches" 0, 1, 2, 3, and 7 through 19 out of 20, often with the 17 through 19 catches paying the same as the solid 20 hit. Some of the other paying "catches" on a 20 spot ticket or any other ticket with high "solid catch" odds are in reality very possible to hit:

Hits	Probability
0	1 in 843.380 (0.11857057%)
1	1 in 86.446 (1.15678605%)
2	1 in 20.115 (4.97142576%)
3	1 in 8.009 (12.48637168%)
4	1 in 4.877 (20.50318987%)
5	1 in 4.287 (23.32807380%)
6	1 in 5.258 (19.01745147%)
7	1 in 8.826 (11.32954556%)
8	1 in 20.055 (4.98618021%)
9	1 in 61.420 (1.62814048%)
10	1 in 253.801 (0.39401000%)
11	1 in 1,423.822 (0.07023351%)
12	1 in 10,968.701 (0.00911685%)
13	1 in 118,084.920 (0.00084685%)
14	1 in 1,821,881.628 (0.00005489%)
15	1 in 41,751,453.986 (0.00000240%)
16	1 in 1,496,372,110.872 (0.00000007%)
17	1 in 90,624,035,964.712
18	1 in 10,512,388,171,906.553
19	1 in 2,946,096,785,176,811.500
20	1 in 3,535,316,142,212,173,800.000

Probabilities change significantly based on the number of spots and numbers that are picked on each ticket.

=== Probability calculation ===
Keno probabilities come from a hypergeometric distribution. For Keno, one calculates the probability of hitting exactly $r$ spots on an $n$-spot ticket by the formula:

P(hitting $r$ spots) $= {{n \choose r} \times {{80-n} \choose {20-r}} \over {80 \choose 20}}$ for an $n$-spot ticket.

To calculate the probability of hitting 4 spots on a 6-spot ticket, the formula is:

$$P(X=4) = {{{6 \choose 4} {{80-6} \choose {20-4}}}\over {80 \choose 20}} \approx 0.02853791$$

where ${n \choose r}$ is calculated as $n! \over r!(n-r)!$, where X! is notation for X factorial. Spreadsheets have the function COMBIN(n,r) to calculate ${n \choose r}$.

To calculate "odds-to-1", divide the probability into 1.0 and subtract 1 from the result.
