= Jeff Edmonds =

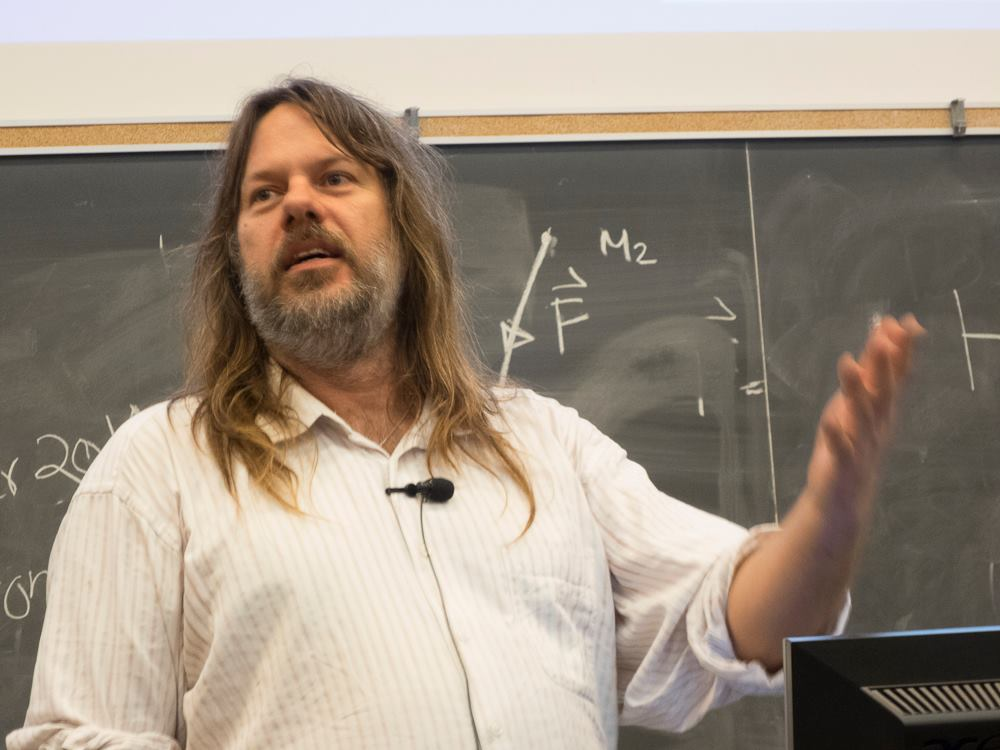
- Born: August 10, 1963 (age 63)
- Education: University of Toronto
- Scientific career
- Fields: Mathematics; Computer Science
- Workplaces: York University
- Doctoral advisor: Faith Ellen

Jeff Edmonds is a Canadian and American mathematician and computer scientist specializing in computational complexity theory.

== Academic career ==
Edmonds received his Bachelors at Waterloo in 1987 and his Ph.D. in 1993 at University of Toronto. His thesis proved lower bounds on time-space tradeoffs. He did his post-doctorate work at the ICSI in Berkeley on secure data transmission over networks for multi-media applications. He joined Department of EECS at Lassonde School of Engineering York University in 1995.

== Research ==
Edmonds' research interests include complexity theory, scheduling, proof systems, probability theory, combinatorics and machine learning.

== Personal life ==
Edmonds is the son of another mathematician, Jack Edmonds.

== See also ==
- Edmonds–Pruhs protocol

== Selected publications ==
- Edmonds, Jeff (2024), How to Think About Algorithms (2nd ed.), Cambridge University Press, doi:10.1017/9781009302180
- Chattopadhyay, Arkadev; Edmonds, Jeff; Ellen, Faith; Pitassi, Toniann (2016), "Upper and Lower Bounds on the Power of Advice", SIAM Journal on Computing, 45 (4): 1412–1432, doi:10.1137/15M1031862.
- Cook, Stephen; Edmonds, Jeff; Medabalimi, Venkatesh; Pitassi, Toniann (2016), "Lower Bounds for Nondeterministic Semantic Read-Once Branching Programs", International Colloquium on Automata, Languages, and Programming: 36:1–6:13, doi:10.4230/LIPIcs.ICALP.2016.36.
- Edmonds, Jeff; Pruhs, Kirk (2012), "Scalably scheduling processes with arbitrary speedup curves (Better Scheduling in the Dark)", ACM Transactions on Algorithms, 8 (3): 28:1–28:10, doi:10.1145/2229163.2229172.
- Edmonds, Jeff; Pruhs, Kirk (2011), "Cake cutting really is not a piece of cake", ACM Transactions on Algorithms, 7 (4): 51:1–51:12, CiteSeerX 10.1.1.146.1536, doi:10.1145/2000807.2000819.
- Leung, Chan; Edmonds, Jeff; Pruhs, Kirk (2011), "Speed Scaling of Processes with Arbitrary Speedup Curves on a Multiprocessor", Theory of Computing Systems, 49 (4): 817–833, doi:10.1007/s00224-011-9349-0.
- Edmonds, Jeff; Sidiropoulos, Anastasios; Zouzias, Anastasios (2010), "Inapproximability for Planar Embedding Problems", Proceedings of the Twenty-First Annual ACM-SIAM Symposium on Discrete Algorithms, pp. 222–235, doi:10.1137/1.9781611973075.20, ISBN 978-0-89871-701-3.
- Edmonds, Jeff; Impagliazzo, Russell; Rudich, Steven; Sgall, Jiri Sgall (2001), "Communication complexity towards lower bounds on circuit depth", Computational Complexity, 10 (3): 210–246, doi:10.1007/s00037-001-8195-x.
- Edmonds, Jeff; Poon, Chung Keung; Achlioptas, Dimitris (1999), "Tight Lower Bounds for st-Connectivity on the NNJAG Model", SIAM Journal on Computing, 28 (6): 2257–2284, doi:10.1137/S0097539795295948.
