= Urn problem =

Mental exercise in probability and statistics

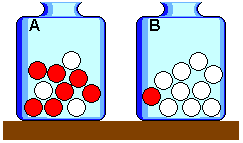
Two urns containing white and red balls

In probability and statistics, an urn problem is an idealized mental exercise in which some objects of real interest (such as atoms, people, cars, etc.) are represented as colored balls in an urn or other container. One pretends to remove one or more balls from the urn; the goal is to determine the probability of drawing one color or another, or some other properties. A number of important variations are described below.

An urn model is either a set of probabilities that describe events within an urn problem, or it is a probability distribution, or a family of such distributions, of random variables associated with urn problems.

== History ==
In Ars Conjectandi (1713), Jacob Bernoulli considered the problem of determining, given a number of pebbles drawn from an urn, the proportions of different colored pebbles within the urn. This problem was known as the inverse probability problem, and was a topic of research in the eighteenth century, attracting the attention of Abraham de Moivre and Thomas Bayes.

Bernoulli used the Latin word urna, which primarily means a clay vessel, but is also the term used in ancient Rome for a vessel of any kind for collecting ballots or lots; the present-day Italian or Spanish word for ballot box is still urna. Bernoulli's inspiration may have been lotteries, elections, or games of chance which involved drawing balls from a container, and it has been asserted that elections in medieval and renaissance Venice, including that of the doge, often included the choice of electors by lot, using balls of different colors drawn from an urn.

== Basic urn model ==
In this basic urn model in probability theory, the urn contains x white and y black balls, well-mixed together. One ball is drawn randomly from the urn and has its color observed; it is then placed back in the urn (or not), and the selection process is repeated.

Possible questions that can be answered in this model are:

- Can I infer the proportion of white and black balls from n observations? With what degree of confidence?
- Knowing x and y, what is the probability of drawing a specific sequence (e.g. one white followed by one black)?
- If I only observe n balls, how sure can I be that there are no black balls? (A variation both on the first and the second question)

== Examples of urn problems ==
- binomial distribution: the distribution of the number of successful draws (trials), i.e. extraction of white balls, given n draws with replacement in an urn with black and white balls.
- multinomial distribution: there are balls of more than two colors. Each time a ball is extracted, it is returned before drawing another ball. This is also known as 'Balls into bins'.
- Occupancy problem: the distribution of the number of occupied urns after the random assignment of k balls into n urns, related to the coupon collector's problem and birthday problem.
- negative binomial distribution: number of draws before a certain number of failures (incorrectly colored draws) occurs.
- geometric distribution: number of draws before the first successful (correctly colored) draw.
- hypergeometric distribution: the balls are not returned to the urn once extracted. Hence, the number of total marbles in the urn decreases. This is referred to as "drawing without replacement", by opposition to "drawing with replacement".
- multivariate hypergeometric distribution: the balls are not returned to the urn once extracted, but with balls of more than two colors.
- Mixed replacement/non-replacement: the urn contains x white and y black balls. While black balls are set aside after a draw (non-replacement), white balls are returned to the urn after a draw (replacement). The probability P(m,k) that k black balls will be drawn after m draws can be calculated recursively using the formula $P(m,k)=\frac{y+1-k}{x+y+1-k}P(m-1,k-1)+\frac{x}{x+y-k}P(m-1,k)$.
- Pólya urn/beta-binomial distribution: each time a ball is drawn, it is replaced along with an additional ball of the same colour. Hence, the number of total balls in the urn grows.
- Hoppe urn: a Pólya urn with an additional ball called the mutator. When the mutator is drawn it is replaced along with an additional ball of an entirely new colour.
- Statistical physics: derivation of energy and velocity distributions.
- The Ellsberg paradox.

== See also ==
- Balls into bins
- Coin-tossing problems
- Coupon collector's problem
- Dirichlet-multinomial distribution
- Noncentral hypergeometric distributions
- Pólya urn model
