= Inverse gamma function =

Inverse of the gamma function

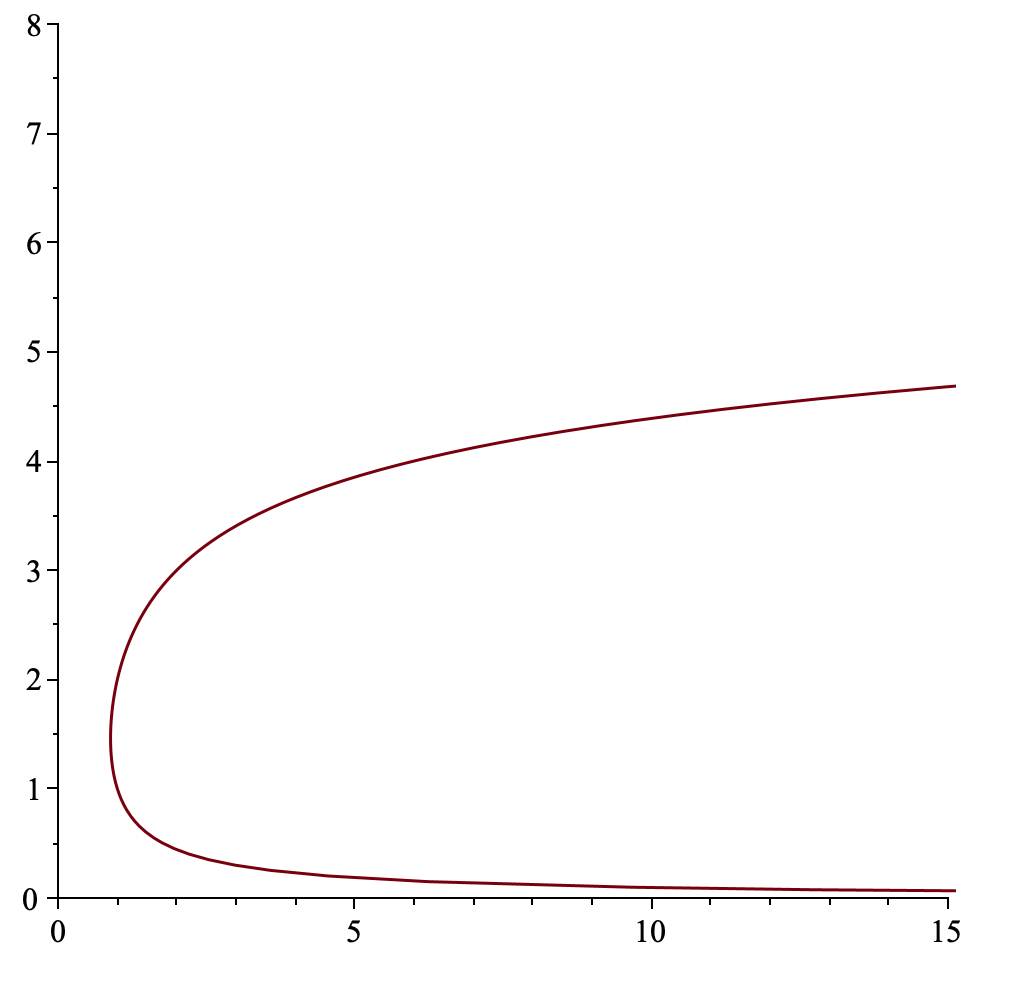
Graph of an inverse gamma function

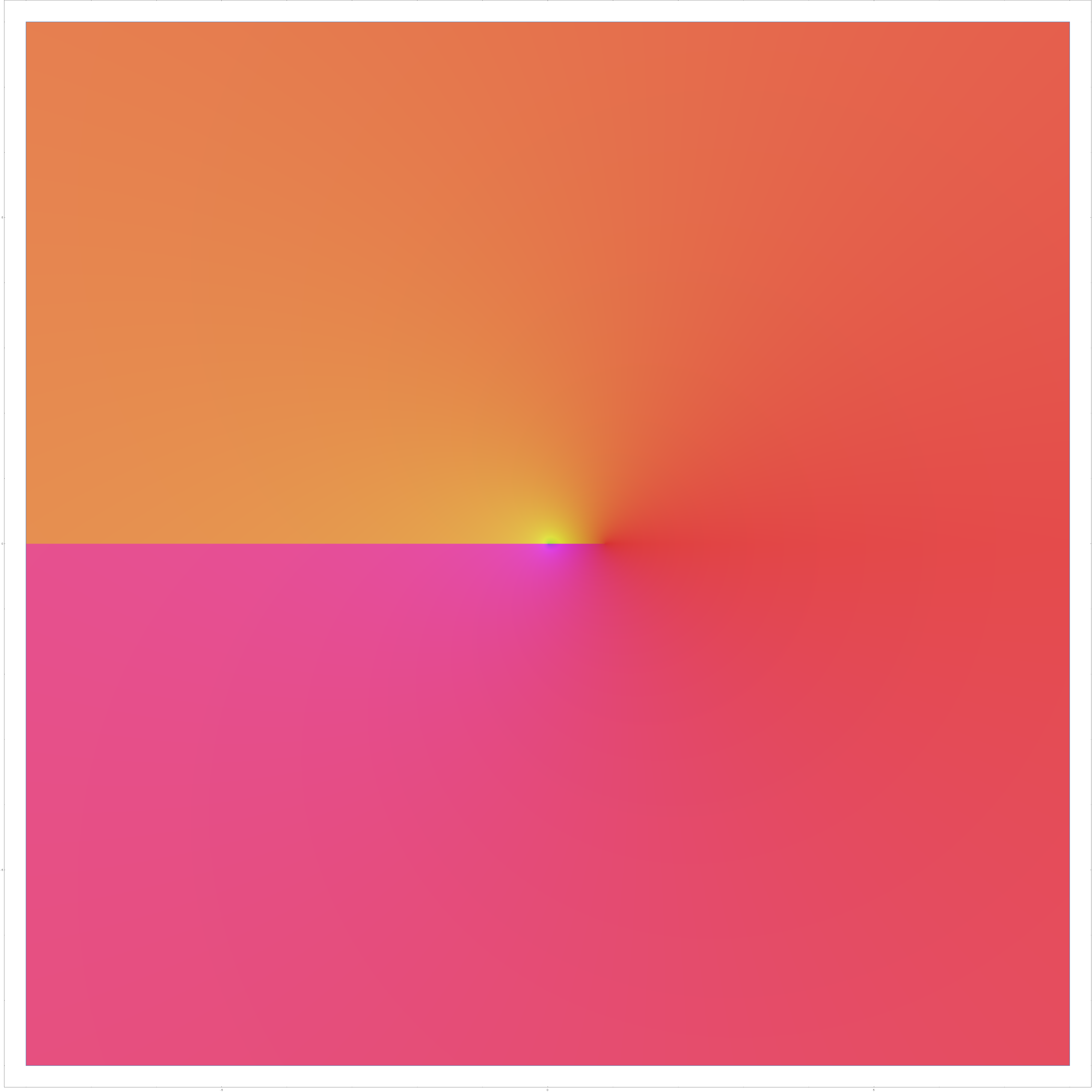
Plot of inverse gamma function in the complex plane

In mathematics, the inverse gamma function $\Gamma^{-1}(x)$ is the inverse function of the gamma function. In other words, $y = \Gamma^{-1}(x)$ whenever $\Gamma(y)=x$. For example, $\Gamma^{-1}(24)=5$. Usually, the inverse gamma function refers to the principal branch with domain on the real interval $\left[\beta, +\infty\right)$ and image on the real interval $\left[\alpha, +\infty\right)$, where $\beta = 0.8856031\ldots$ is the minimum value of the gamma function on the positive real axis and $\alpha = \Gamma^{-1}(\beta) = 1.4616321\ldots$ is the location of that minimum.

== Definition ==
The inverse gamma function may be defined by the following integral representation
$$\Gamma^{-1}(x)=a+bx+\int_{-\infty}^{\Gamma(\alpha)}\left(\frac{1}{x-t}-\frac{t}{t^{2}-1}\right)d\mu(t)\,,$$
where $\mu (t)$ is a Borel measure such that
$$\int_{-\infty}^{\Gamma\left(\alpha\right)}\left(\frac{1}{t^{2}+1}\right)d\mu(t)<\infty \,,$$
and $a$ and $b$ are real numbers with $b \geqq 0$.

== Series Expansions ==
Let $\Gamma_{n}^{-1}(z)$ be the $n$-th branch of the gamma function, with $\Gamma_{0}^{-1}(z)$ denoting the principal branch. To obtain a series expansion of the inverse gamma function one can first compute the series expansion of the reciprocal gamma function $\frac{1}{\Gamma(x)}$ near the zeros at the negative integers, and then invert the series.

Setting $z=\frac{1}{x}$ in the expansion then yields, for $n\ge1$:
$$\Gamma_{n}^{-1}(z)=-n+1-\frac{\left(-1\right)^{n}}{\left(n-1\right)!z}+\frac{\psi^{(0)}\left(n\right)}{\left(n-1\right)!^{2}z^{2}}-\frac{\left(-1\right)^{n}\left(\pi^{2}+9\psi^{(0)}\left(n\right)^{2}-3\psi^{(1)}\left(n\right)\right)}{6\left(n-1\right)!^{3}z^{3}}+O\left(\frac{1}{z^{4}}\right)\,,$$
where $\psi^{(n)}(x)$ is the polygamma function.

This can be rigorously justified by the Lagrange inversion theorem, which says that if $z = f(w)$ where f is analytic at a point a and $f'(a)\neq 0$, then the inverse $w=g(z)$ is given by a power series

$$g(z) = a + \sum_{n=1}^{\infty} g_n \frac{(z - f(a))^n}{n!},\quad g_n = \lim_{w \to a} \frac{d^{n-1}}{dw^{n-1}} \left[\left( \frac{w-a}{f(w) - f(a)} \right)^n \right].$$

For example, for the first non principal branch, set $f(x)=\frac{1}{\Gamma(x)}$ and $a=0$ such that $f(a)=0$. The formula gives

$g(z) =\sum_{n=1}^{\infty} \frac{z^n}{n!}\left[ \lim_{w \to 0} \frac{d^{n-1}}{dw^{n-1}} \Gamma(w+1)^n\right].$

Now, assuming $\frac{1}{\Gamma(x)}$ is invertible when restricted to an appropriate region, setting $z=\frac{1}{x}$ gives

$\Gamma_1^{-1}(x) =\sum_{n=1}^{\infty} \frac{x^{-n}}{n!}\left[\frac{d^{n-1}}{dw^{n-1}}\Gamma(w+1)^n\right]_{w=0}.$

== Approximation ==
To compute the branches of the inverse gamma function one can first compute the Taylor series of $\Gamma(x)$ near $\alpha$. The series can then be truncated and inverted, which yields successively better approximations to $\Gamma^{-1}(x)$. For instance, we have the quadratic approximation:

$$\Gamma^{-1}\left(x\right)\approx\alpha+\sqrt{\frac{2\left(x-\Gamma\left(\alpha\right)\right)}{\psi^{\left(1 \right)}\left(\alpha \right)\Gamma\left(\alpha\right)}}.$$

where $\psi^{\left(1 \right)} \left(x \right)$ is the trigamma function. The inverse gamma function also has the following asymptotic formula
$$\Gamma^{-1}(x)\sim\frac{1}{2}+\frac{\ln\left(\frac{x}{\sqrt{2\pi}}\right)}{W_{0}\left(e^{-1}\ln\left(\frac{x}{\sqrt{2\pi}}\right)\right)}\,,$$
where $W_0(x)$ is the Lambert W function. The formula is found by inverting the Stirling approximation, and so can also be expanded into an asymptotic series.
