= Generalized variance =

The generalized variance is a scalar value which generalizes variance for multivariate random variables. It was introduced by Samuel S. Wilks.

The generalized variance is defined as the determinant of the covariance matrix, $\det(\Sigma)$. It can be shown to be related to the multidimensional scatter of points around their mean.

Minimizing the generalized variance gives the Kalman filter gain.
