= Quadratic form (statistics) =

Vector in statistics

In multivariate statistics, if $\varepsilon$ is a vector of $n$ random variables, and $\Lambda$ is an $n$-dimensional symmetric matrix, then the scalar quantity $\varepsilon^T\Lambda\varepsilon$ is known as a quadratic form in $\varepsilon$.

== Expectation ==
It can be shown that

$$\operatorname{E}\left[\varepsilon^T\Lambda\varepsilon\right]=\operatorname{tr}\left[\Lambda \Sigma\right] + \mu^T\Lambda\mu$$

where $\mu$ and $\Sigma$ are the expected value and variance-covariance matrix of $\varepsilon$, respectively, and tr denotes the trace of a matrix. This result only depends on the existence of $\mu$ and $\Sigma$; in particular, normality of $\varepsilon$ is not required.

A book treatment of the topic of quadratic forms in random variables is that of Mathai and Provost.

=== Proof ===
Since the quadratic form is a scalar quantity, $\varepsilon^T\Lambda\varepsilon = \operatorname{tr}(\varepsilon^T\Lambda\varepsilon)$.

Next, by the cyclic property of the trace operator,

$$\operatorname{E}[\operatorname{tr}(\varepsilon^T\Lambda\varepsilon)] = \operatorname{E}[\operatorname{tr}(\Lambda\varepsilon\varepsilon^T)].$$

Since the trace operator is a linear combination of the components of the matrix, it therefore follows from the linearity of the expectation operator that

$$\operatorname{E}[\operatorname{tr}(\Lambda\varepsilon\varepsilon^T)] = \operatorname{tr}(\Lambda \operatorname{E}(\varepsilon\varepsilon^T)).$$

A standard property of variances then tells us that this is

$$\operatorname{tr}(\Lambda (\Sigma + \mu \mu^T)).$$

Applying the cyclic property of the trace operator again, we get

$$\operatorname{tr}(\Lambda\Sigma) + \operatorname{tr}(\Lambda \mu \mu^T) = \operatorname{tr}(\Lambda\Sigma) + \operatorname{tr}(\mu^T\Lambda\mu) = \operatorname{tr}(\Lambda\Sigma) + \mu^T\Lambda\mu.$$

== Variance in the Gaussian case ==
In general, the variance of a quadratic form depends greatly on the distribution of $\varepsilon$. However, if $\varepsilon$ does follow a multivariate normal distribution, the variance of the quadratic form becomes particularly tractable. Assume for the moment that $\Lambda$ is a symmetric matrix. Then,

$\operatorname{var} \left[\varepsilon^T\Lambda\varepsilon\right] = 2\operatorname{tr}\left[\Lambda \Sigma\Lambda \Sigma\right] + 4\mu^T\Lambda\Sigma\Lambda\mu$.

In fact, this can be generalized to find the covariance between two quadratic forms on the same $\varepsilon$ (once again, $\Lambda_1$ and $\Lambda_2$ must both be symmetric):

$\operatorname{cov}\left[\varepsilon^T\Lambda_1\varepsilon,\varepsilon^T\Lambda_2\varepsilon\right]=2\operatorname{tr}\left[\Lambda _1\Sigma\Lambda_2 \Sigma\right] + 4\mu^T\Lambda_1\Sigma\Lambda_2\mu$.

In addition, a quadratic form such as this follows a generalized chi-squared distribution.

=== Computing the variance in the non-symmetric case ===
The case for general $\Lambda$ can be derived by noting that

$$\varepsilon^T\Lambda^T\varepsilon=\varepsilon^T\Lambda\varepsilon$$

so

$$\varepsilon^T\tilde{\Lambda}\varepsilon=\varepsilon^T\left(\Lambda+\Lambda^T\right)\varepsilon/2$$

is a quadratic form in the symmetric matrix $\tilde{\Lambda}=\left(\Lambda+\Lambda^T\right)/2$, so the mean and variance expressions are the same, provided $\Lambda$ is replaced by $\tilde{\Lambda}$ therein.

== Examples of quadratic forms ==
In the setting where one has a set of observations $y$ and an operator matrix $H$, then the residual sum of squares can be written as a quadratic form in $y$:

$$\textrm{RSS}=y^T(I-H)^T (I-H)y.$$

For procedures where the matrix $H$ is symmetric and idempotent, and the errors are Gaussian with covariance matrix $\sigma^2I$, $\textrm{RSS}/\sigma^2$ has a chi-squared distribution with $k$ degrees of freedom and noncentrality parameter $\lambda$, where

$$k=\operatorname{tr}\left[(I-H)^T(I-H)\right]$$
$$\lambda=\mu^T(I-H)^T(I-H)\mu/2$$

may be found by matching the first two central moments of a noncentral chi-squared random variable to the expressions given in the first two sections. If $Hy$ estimates $\mu$ with no bias, then the noncentrality $\lambda$ is zero and $\textrm{RSS}/\sigma^2$ follows a central chi-squared distribution.

== See also ==
- Quadratic form
- Covariance matrix
- Matrix representation of conic sections
