= Cross-covariance matrix =

Type of matrix in probability theory and statistics

In probability theory and statistics, a cross-covariance matrix is a matrix whose element in the i, j position is the covariance between the i-th element of a random vector and j-th element of another random vector. When the two random vectors are the same, the cross-covariance matrix is referred to as covariance matrix. A random vector is a random variable with multiple dimensions. Each element of the vector is a scalar random variable. Each element has either a finite number of observed empirical values or a finite or infinite number of potential values. The potential values are specified by a theoretical joint probability distribution. Intuitively, the cross-covariance matrix generalizes the notion of covariance to multiple dimensions.

The cross-covariance matrix of two random vectors $\mathbf{X}$ and $\mathbf{Y}$ is typically denoted by $\operatorname{K}_{\mathbf{X}\mathbf{Y}}$ or $\Sigma_{\mathbf{X}\mathbf{Y}}$.

== Definition ==
For random vectors $\mathbf{X}$ and $\mathbf{Y}$, each containing random elements whose expected value and variance exist, the cross-covariance matrix of $\mathbf{X}$ and $\mathbf{Y}$ is defined by

| $\operatorname{K}_{\mathbf{X}\mathbf{Y}} = \operatorname{cov}(\mathbf{X},\mathbf{Y}) \stackrel{\mathrm{def}}{=}\ \operatorname{E}[(\mathbf{X}-\mathbf{\mu_X})(\mathbf{Y}-\mathbf{\mu_Y})^{\rm T}]$ | Eq.1 |

where $\mathbf{\mu_X} = \operatorname{E}[\mathbf{X}]$ and $\mathbf{\mu_Y} = \operatorname{E}[\mathbf{Y}]$ are vectors containing the expected values of $\mathbf{X}$ and $\mathbf{Y}$. The vectors $\mathbf{X}$ and $\mathbf{Y}$ need not have the same dimension, and either might be a scalar value.

The cross-covariance matrix is the matrix whose $(i,j)$ entry is the covariance

$$\operatorname{K}_{X_i Y_j} = \operatorname{cov}[X_i, Y_j] = \operatorname{E}[(X_i - \operatorname{E}[X_i])(Y_j - \operatorname{E}[Y_j])]$$

between the i-th element of $\mathbf{X}$ and the j-th element of $\mathbf{Y}$. This gives the following component-wise definition of the cross-covariance matrix.

$$\operatorname{K}_{\mathbf{X}\mathbf{Y}}=
\begin{bmatrix}
\mathrm{E}[(X_1 - \operatorname{E}[X_1])(Y_1 - \operatorname{E}[Y_1])] & \mathrm{E}[(X_1 - \operatorname{E}[X_1])(Y_2 - \operatorname{E}[Y_2])] & \cdots & \mathrm{E}[(X_1 - \operatorname{E}[X_1])(Y_n - \operatorname{E}[Y_n])] \\ \\
\mathrm{E}[(X_2 - \operatorname{E}[X_2])(Y_1 - \operatorname{E}[Y_1])] & \mathrm{E}[(X_2 - \operatorname{E}[X_2])(Y_2 - \operatorname{E}[Y_2])] & \cdots & \mathrm{E}[(X_2 - \operatorname{E}[X_2])(Y_n - \operatorname{E}[Y_n])] \\ \\
\vdots & \vdots & \ddots & \vdots \\ \\
\mathrm{E}[(X_m - \operatorname{E}[X_m])(Y_1 - \operatorname{E}[Y_1])] & \mathrm{E}[(X_m - \operatorname{E}[X_m])(Y_2 - \operatorname{E}[Y_2])] & \cdots & \mathrm{E}[(X_m - \operatorname{E}[X_m])(Y_n - \operatorname{E}[Y_n])]
\end{bmatrix}$$

== Example ==
For example, if $\mathbf{X} = \left( X_1,X_2,X_3 \right)^{\rm T}$ and $\mathbf{Y} = \left( Y_1,Y_2 \right)^{\rm T}$ are random vectors, then $\operatorname{cov}(\mathbf{X},\mathbf{Y})$ is a $3 \times 2$ matrix whose $(i,j)$-th entry is $\operatorname{cov}(X_i,Y_j)$.

== Properties ==
For the cross-covariance matrix, the following basic properties apply:

1. $\operatorname{cov}(\mathbf{X},\mathbf{Y}) = \operatorname{E}[\mathbf{X} \mathbf{Y}^{\rm T}] - \mathbf{\mu_X} \mathbf{\mu_Y}^{\rm T}$
2. $\operatorname{cov}(\mathbf{X},\mathbf{Y}) = \operatorname{cov}(\mathbf{Y},\mathbf{X})^{\rm T}$
3. $\operatorname{cov}(\mathbf{X_1} + \mathbf{X_2},\mathbf{Y}) = \operatorname{cov}(\mathbf{X_1},\mathbf{Y}) + \operatorname{cov}(\mathbf{X_2}, \mathbf{Y})$
4. $\operatorname{cov}(A\mathbf{X}+ \mathbf{a}, B^{\rm T}\mathbf{Y} + \mathbf{b}) = A\, \operatorname{cov}(\mathbf{X}, \mathbf{Y}) \,B$
5. If $\mathbf{X}$ and $\mathbf{Y}$ are independent (or somewhat less restrictedly, if every random variable in $\mathbf{X}$ is uncorrelated with every random variable in $\mathbf{Y}$), then $\operatorname{cov}(\mathbf{X},\mathbf{Y}) = 0_{p\times q}$

where $\mathbf{X}$, $\mathbf{X_1}$ and $\mathbf{X_2}$ are random $p \times 1$ vectors, $\mathbf{Y}$ is a random $q \times 1$ vector, $\mathbf{a}$ is a $q \times 1$ vector, $\mathbf{b}$ is a $p \times 1$ vector, $A$ and $B$ are $q \times p$ matrices of constants, and $0_{p\times q}$ is a $p \times q$ matrix of zeroes.

== Definition for complex random vectors ==
If $\mathbf{Z}$ and $\mathbf{W}$ are complex random vectors, the definition of the cross-covariance matrix is slightly changed. Transposition is replaced by Hermitian transposition:

$$\operatorname{K}_{\mathbf{Z}\mathbf{W}} = \operatorname{cov}(\mathbf{Z},\mathbf{W}) \stackrel{\mathrm{def}}{=}\ \operatorname{E}[(\mathbf{Z}-\mathbf{\mu_Z})(\mathbf{W}-\mathbf{\mu_W})^{\rm H}]$$

For complex random vectors, another matrix called the pseudo-cross-covariance matrix is defined as follows:

$$\operatorname{J}_{\mathbf{Z}\mathbf{W}} = \operatorname{cov}(\mathbf{Z},\overline{\mathbf{W}}) \stackrel{\mathrm{def}}{=}\ \operatorname{E}[(\mathbf{Z}-\mathbf{\mu_Z})(\mathbf{W}-\mathbf{\mu_W})^{\rm T}]$$

== Uncorrelatedness ==
Two random vectors $\mathbf{X}$ and $\mathbf{Y}$ are called uncorrelated if their cross-covariance matrix $\operatorname{K}_{\mathbf{X}\mathbf{Y}}$ matrix is a zero matrix.

Complex random vectors $\mathbf{Z}$ and $\mathbf{W}$ are called uncorrelated if their covariance matrix and pseudo-covariance matrix is zero, i.e. if $\operatorname{K}_{\mathbf{Z}\mathbf{W}} = \operatorname{J}_{\mathbf{Z}\mathbf{W}} = 0$.
