= Cross-correlation matrix =

Concept in digital signal processing

The cross-correlation matrix of two random vectors is a matrix containing as elements the cross-correlations of all pairs of elements of the random vectors. The cross-correlation matrix is used in various digital signal processing algorithms.

== Definition ==
For two random vectors $\mathbf{X} = (X_1,\ldots,X_m)^{\rm T}$ and $\mathbf{Y} = (Y_1,\ldots,Y_n)^{\rm T}$, each containing random elements whose expected value and variance exist, the cross-correlation matrix of $\mathbf{X}$ and $\mathbf{Y}$ is defined by

$\operatorname{R}_{\mathbf{X}\mathbf{Y}} \triangleq\ \operatorname{E}[\mathbf{X} \mathbf{Y}^{\rm T}]$

and has dimensions $m \times n$. Written component-wise:

$$\operatorname{R}_{\mathbf{X}\mathbf{Y}} =
\begin{bmatrix}
\operatorname{E}[X_1 Y_1] & \operatorname{E}[X_1 Y_2] & \cdots & \operatorname{E}[X_1 Y_n] \\ \\
\operatorname{E}[X_2 Y_1] & \operatorname{E}[X_2 Y_2] & \cdots & \operatorname{E}[X_2 Y_n] \\ \\
\vdots & \vdots & \ddots & \vdots \\ \\
\operatorname{E}[X_m Y_1] & \operatorname{E}[X_m Y_2] & \cdots & \operatorname{E}[X_m Y_n] \\ \\
\end{bmatrix}$$

The random vectors $\mathbf{X}$ and $\mathbf{Y}$ need not have the same dimension, and either might be a scalar value.

== Example ==
For example, if $\mathbf{X} = \left( X_1,X_2,X_3 \right)^{\rm T}$ and $\mathbf{Y} = \left( Y_1,Y_2 \right)^{\rm T}$ are random vectors, then $\operatorname{R}_{\mathbf{X}\mathbf{Y}}$ is a $3 \times 2$ matrix whose $(i,j)$-th entry is $\operatorname{E}[X_i Y_j]$.

== Complex random vectors ==
If $\mathbf{Z} = (Z_1,\ldots,Z_m)^{\rm T}$ and $\mathbf{W} = (W_1,\ldots,W_n)^{\rm T}$ are complex random vectors, each containing random variables whose expected value and variance exist, the cross-correlation matrix of $\mathbf{Z}$ and $\mathbf{W}$ is defined by

$$\operatorname{R}_{\mathbf{Z}\mathbf{W}} \triangleq\ \operatorname{E}[\mathbf{Z} \mathbf{W}^{\rm H}]$$

where ${}^{\rm H}$ denotes Hermitian transposition.

== Uncorrelatedness ==
Two random vectors $\mathbf{X}=(X_1,\ldots,X_m)^{\rm T}$ and $\mathbf{Y}=(Y_1,\ldots,Y_n)^{\rm T}$ are called uncorrelated if

$$\operatorname{E}[\mathbf{X} \mathbf{Y}^{\rm T}] = \operatorname{E}[\mathbf{X}]\operatorname{E}[\mathbf{Y}]^{\rm T}.$$

They are uncorrelated if and only if their cross-covariance matrix $\operatorname{K}_{\mathbf{X}\mathbf{Y}}$ matrix is zero.

In the case of two complex random vectors $\mathbf{Z}$ and $\mathbf{W}$ they are called uncorrelated if

$$\operatorname{E}[\mathbf{Z} \mathbf{W}^{\rm H}] = \operatorname{E}[\mathbf{Z}]\operatorname{E}[\mathbf{W}]^{\rm H}$$

and

$$\operatorname{E}[\mathbf{Z} \mathbf{W}^{\rm T}] = \operatorname{E}[\mathbf{Z}]\operatorname{E}[\mathbf{W}]^{\rm T}.$$

== Properties ==
=== Relation to the cross-covariance matrix ===
The cross-correlation is related to the cross-covariance matrix as follows:

$$\operatorname{K}_{\mathbf{X}\mathbf{Y}} = \operatorname{E}[(\mathbf{X} - \operatorname{E}[\mathbf{X}])(\mathbf{Y} - \operatorname{E}[\mathbf{Y}])^{\rm T}] =  \operatorname{R}_{\mathbf{X}\mathbf{Y}} - \operatorname{E}[\mathbf{X}] \operatorname{E}[\mathbf{Y}]^{\rm T}$$
Respectively for complex random vectors:
$$\operatorname{K}_{\mathbf{Z}\mathbf{W}} = \operatorname{E}[(\mathbf{Z} - \operatorname{E}[\mathbf{Z}])(\mathbf{W} - \operatorname{E}[\mathbf{W}])^{\rm H}] =  \operatorname{R}_{\mathbf{Z}\mathbf{W}} - \operatorname{E}[\mathbf{Z}] \operatorname{E}[\mathbf{W}]^{\rm H}$$

== See also ==
- Autocorrelation
- Correlation does not imply causation
- Covariance function
- Pearson product-moment correlation coefficient
- Correlation function (astronomy)
- Correlation function (statistical mechanics)
- Correlation function (quantum field theory)
- Mutual information
- Rate distortion theory
- Radial distribution function
