= Impropriety =

Impropriety may refer to various kinds of misconduct:

- Inappropriateness, conduct seen as unethical
- Immorality
- Obscenity
- Vulgarity
- A complex random variable not being proper

== See also ==
- Appearance of impropriety, a legal–ethical concept
- Propriety
