= Complex normal distribution =

Statistical distribution of complex random variables

Complex normal
- Parameters: $\mathbf{\mu} \in \mathbb{C}^n$ — location $\Gamma \in \mathbb{C}^{n \times n}$ — covariance matrix (positive semi-definite matrix) $C \in \mathbb{C}^{n \times n}$ — relation matrix (complex symmetric matrix)
- Support: $\mathbb{C}^n$
- PDF: complicated, see text
- Mean: $\mathbf{\mu}$
- Mode: $\mathbf{\mu}$
- Variance: $\Gamma$
- CF: $\exp\!\big\{i\operatorname{Re}(\overline{w}'\mu) - \tfrac{1}{4}\big(\overline{w}'\Gamma w + \operatorname{Re}(\overline{w}'C\overline{w})\big)\big\}$

In probability theory, the family of complex normal distributions, denoted $\mathcal{CN}$ or $\mathcal{N}_{\mathcal{C}}$, characterizes complex random variables whose real and imaginary parts are jointly normal. The complex normal family has three parameters: location parameter μ, covariance matrix $\Gamma$, and the relation matrix $C$. The standard complex normal is the univariate distribution with $\mu = 0$, $\Gamma=1$, and $C=0$.

An important subclass of complex normal family is called the circularly-symmetric (central) complex normal and corresponds to the case of zero relation matrix and zero mean: $\mu = 0$ and $C=0$. This case is used extensively in signal processing, where it is sometimes referred to as just complex normal in the literature.

== Definitions ==
=== Complex standard normal random variable ===
The standard complex normal random variable or standard complex Gaussian random variable is a complex random variable $Z$ whose real and imaginary parts are independent normally distributed random variables with mean zero and variance $1/2$. Formally,

$Z \sim \mathcal{CN}(0,1) \quad \iff \quad \Re(Z) \perp\!\!\!\perp \Im(Z) \text{ and } \Re(Z) \sim \mathcal{N}(0,1/2) \text{ and } \Im(Z) \sim \mathcal{N}(0,1/2)$	Eq.1

where $\perp\!\!\!\perp$ denotes independence and $Z \sim \mathcal{CN}(0,1)$ denotes that $Z$ is a standard complex normal random variable.

=== Complex normal random variable ===
Suppose $X$ and $Y$ are real random variables such that $(X,Y)^{\mathrm T}$ is a 2-dimensional normal random vector. Then the complex random variable $Z=X+iY$ is called complex normal random variable or complex Gaussian random variable.

$Z \text{ complex normal random variable} \quad \iff \quad (\Re(Z),\Im(Z))^{\mathrm T} \text{ real normal random vector}$	Eq.2

=== Complex standard normal random vector ===
A n-dimensional complex random vector $\mathbf{Z}=(Z_1,\ldots,Z_n)^{\mathrm T}$ is a complex standard normal random vector or complex standard Gaussian random vector if its components are independent and all of them are standard complex normal random variables as defined above. That $\mathbf{Z}$ is a standard complex normal random vector is denoted $\mathbf{Z} \sim \mathcal{CN}(0,\boldsymbol{I}_n)$.

$\mathbf{Z} \sim \mathcal{CN}(0,\boldsymbol{I}_n) \quad \iff (Z_1,\ldots,Z_n) \text{ independent} \text{ and for } 1 \leq i \leq n : Z_i \sim \mathcal{CN}(0,1)$	Eq.3

=== Complex normal random vector ===
If $\mathbf{X}=(X_1,\ldots,X_n)^{\mathrm T}$ and $\mathbf{Y}=(Y_1,\ldots,Y_n)^{\mathrm T}$ are random vectors in $\mathbb{R}^n$ such that $[\mathbf{X},\mathbf{Y}]$ is a normal random vector with $2n$ components. Then we say that the complex random vector

$$\mathbf{Z} = \mathbf{X} + i \mathbf{Y} \,$$

is a complex normal random vector or a complex Gaussian random vector.

$\mathbf{Z} \text{ complex normal random vector} \quad \iff \quad (\Re(\mathbf{Z}^{\mathrm T}),\Im(\mathbf{Z}^{\mathrm T}))^{\mathrm T} = (\Re(Z_1),\ldots,\Re(Z_n),\Im(Z_1),\ldots,\Im(Z_n))^{\mathrm T} \text{ real normal random vector}$	Eq.4

== Mean, covariance, and relation ==
The complex Gaussian distribution can be described with 3 parameters:

$$\mu = \operatorname{E}[\mathbf{Z}], \quad
\Gamma = \operatorname{E}[(\mathbf{Z}-\mu)({\mathbf{Z}}-\mu)^{\mathrm H}], \quad
C = \operatorname{E}[(\mathbf{Z}-\mu)(\mathbf{Z}-\mu)^{\mathrm T}],$$

where $\mathbf{Z}^{\mathrm T}$ denotes matrix transpose of $\mathbf{Z}$, and $\mathbf{Z}^{\mathrm H}$ denotes conjugate transpose.

Here the location parameter $\mu$ is a n-dimensional complex vector; the covariance matrix $\Gamma$ is Hermitian and non-negative definite; and, the relation matrix or pseudo-covariance matrix $C$ is symmetric. The complex normal random vector $\mathbf{Z}$ can now be denoted as
$$\mathbf{Z}\ \sim\ \mathcal{CN}(\mu,\ \Gamma,\ C).$$
Moreover, matrices $\Gamma$ and $C$ are such that the matrix

$$P = \overline{\Gamma} - {C}^{\mathrm H}\Gamma^{-1}C$$

is also non-negative definite where $\overline{\Gamma}$ denotes the complex conjugate of $\Gamma$.

== Relationships between covariance matrices ==
As for any complex random vector, the matrices $\Gamma$ and $C$ can be related to the covariance matrices of $\mathbf{X} = \Re(\mathbf{Z})$ and $\mathbf{Y} = \Im(\mathbf{Z})$ via expressions

$$\begin{align}
& V_{XX} \equiv \operatorname{E}[(\mathbf{X}-\mu_X)(\mathbf{X}-\mu_X)^\mathrm T] = \tfrac{1}{2}\operatorname{Re}[\Gamma + C], \quad
V_{XY} \equiv \operatorname{E}[(\mathbf{X}-\mu_X)(\mathbf{Y}-\mu_Y)^\mathrm T] = \tfrac{1}{2}\operatorname{Im}[-\Gamma + C], \\
& V_{YX} \equiv \operatorname{E}[(\mathbf{Y}-\mu_Y)(\mathbf{X}-\mu_X)^\mathrm T] = \tfrac{1}{2}\operatorname{Im}[\Gamma + C], \quad\,
V_{YY} \equiv \operatorname{E}[(\mathbf{Y}-\mu_Y)(\mathbf{Y}-\mu_Y)^\mathrm T] = \tfrac{1}{2}\operatorname{Re}[\Gamma - C],
\end{align}$$

and conversely

$$\begin{align}
& \Gamma = V_{XX} + V_{YY} + i(V_{YX} - V_{XY}), \\
& C = V_{XX} - V_{YY} + i(V_{YX} + V_{XY}).
\end{align}$$

== Density function ==
The probability density function for complex normal distribution can be computed as

$$\begin{align}
f(z) &= \frac{1}{\pi^n\sqrt{\det(\Gamma)\det(P)}}\,
\exp\!\left\{-\frac12 \begin{bmatrix} z - \mu \\ \overline z -\overline \mu\end{bmatrix}^{\mathrm H}
\begin{bmatrix}\Gamma & C \\ \overline{C}&\overline\Gamma\end{bmatrix}^{\!\!-1}\!
\begin{bmatrix}z-\mu \\ \overline{z}-\overline{\mu}\end{bmatrix}
\right\} \\[8pt]
&= \tfrac{\sqrt{\det\left(\overline{P^{-1}}-R^{\ast} P^{-1}R\right)\det(P^{-1})}}{\pi^n}\,
e^{ -(z-\mu)^\ast\overline{P^{-1}}(z-\mu) +
\operatorname{Re}\left((z-\mu)^\intercal R^\intercal\overline{P^{-1}}(z-\mu)\right)},
\end{align}$$

where $R=C^{\mathrm H} \Gamma^{-1}$ and $P=\overline{\Gamma}-RC$.

== Characteristic function ==
The characteristic function of complex normal distribution is given by

$$\varphi(w) = \exp\!\big\{i\operatorname{Re}(\overline{w}'\mu) - \tfrac{1}{4}\big(\overline{w}'\Gamma w + \operatorname{Re}(\overline{w}'C\overline{w})\big)\big\},$$

where the argument $w$ is an n-dimensional complex vector.

== Properties ==
- If $\mathbf{Z}$ is a complex normal n-vector, $\boldsymbol{A}$ an m×n matrix, and $b$ a constant m-vector, then the linear transform $\boldsymbol{A}\mathbf{Z}+b$ will be distributed also complex-normally:

$$Z\ \sim\ \mathcal{CN}(\mu,\, \Gamma,\, C) \quad \Rightarrow \quad AZ+b\ \sim\ \mathcal{CN}(A\mu+b,\, A \Gamma A^{\mathrm H},\, A C A^{\mathrm T})$$

- If $\mathbf{Z}$ is a complex normal n-vector, then

$$2\Big[ (\mathbf{Z}-\mu)^{\mathrm H} \overline{P^{-1}}(\mathbf{Z}-\mu) -
\operatorname{Re}\big((\mathbf{Z}-\mu)^{\mathrm T} R^{\mathrm T} \overline{P^{-1}}(\mathbf{Z}-\mu)\big)
\Big]\ \sim\ \chi^2(2n)$$

- Central limit theorem. If $Z_1,\ldots,Z_T$ are independent and identically distributed complex random variables, then

$$\sqrt{T}\Big( \tfrac{1}{T}\textstyle\sum_{t=1}^T Z_t - \operatorname{E}[Z_t]\Big) \ \xrightarrow{d}\
\mathcal{CN}(0,\,\Gamma,\,C),$$
where $\Gamma = \operatorname{E}[Z Z^{\mathrm H}]$ and $C = \operatorname{E}[Z Z^{\mathrm T}]$.

- The modulus of a complex normal random variable follows a Hoyt distribution.

== Circularly-symmetric central case ==
=== Definition ===
A complex random vector $\mathbf{Z}$ is called circularly symmetric if for every deterministic $\varphi \in [-\pi,\pi)$ the distribution of $e^{\mathrm i \varphi}\mathbf{Z}$ equals the distribution of $\mathbf{Z}$.

Central normal complex random vectors that are circularly symmetric are of particular interest because they are fully specified by the covariance matrix $\Gamma$.

The circularly-symmetric (central) complex normal distribution corresponds to the case of zero mean and zero relation matrix, i.e. $\mu = 0$ and $C=0$. This is usually denoted

$$\mathbf{Z} \sim \mathcal{CN}(0,\,\Gamma)$$

=== Distribution of real and imaginary parts ===
If $\mathbf{Z}=\mathbf{X}+i\mathbf{Y}$ is circularly-symmetric (central) complex normal, then the vector $[\mathbf{X}, \mathbf{Y}]$ is multivariate normal with covariance structure

$$\begin{pmatrix}\mathbf{X} \\ \mathbf{Y}\end{pmatrix} \ \sim\
\mathcal{N}\Big( \begin{bmatrix}
0 \\
0
\end{bmatrix},\
\tfrac{1}{2}\begin{bmatrix}
\operatorname{Re}\,\Gamma & -\operatorname{Im}\,\Gamma \\
\operatorname{Im}\,\Gamma &  \operatorname{Re}\,\Gamma
\end{bmatrix}\Big)$$

where $\Gamma=\operatorname{E}[\mathbf{Z} \mathbf{Z}^{\mathrm H}]$.

=== Probability density function ===
For nonsingular covariance matrix $\Gamma$, its distribution can also be simplified as

$$f_{\mathbf{Z}}(\mathbf{z}) = \tfrac{1}{\pi^n \det(\Gamma)}\, e^{ -(\mathbf{z}-\mathbf{\mu})^{\mathrm H} \Gamma^{-1} (\mathbf{z}-\mathbf{\mu})}$$.

Therefore, if the non-zero mean $\mu$ and covariance matrix $\Gamma$ are unknown, a suitable log likelihood function for a single observation vector $z$ would be

$$\ln(L(\mu,\Gamma)) = -\ln (\det(\Gamma)) -\overline{(z - \mu)}' \Gamma^{-1} (z - \mu) -n \ln(\pi).$$

The standard complex normal (defined in Eq.1) corresponds to the distribution of a scalar random variable with $\mu = 0$, $C=0$ and $\Gamma=1$. Thus, the standard complex normal distribution has density

$$f_Z(z) = \tfrac{1}{\pi} e^{-\overline{z}z} = \tfrac{1}{\pi} e^{-|z|^2}.$$

=== Properties ===
The above expression demonstrates why the case $C=0$, $\mu = 0$ is called “circularly-symmetric”. The density function depends only on the magnitude of $z$ but not on its argument. As such, the magnitude $|z|$ of a standard complex normal random variable will have the Rayleigh distribution and the squared magnitude $|z|^2$ will have the exponential distribution, whereas the argument will be distributed uniformly on $[-\pi,\pi]$.

If $\left\{ \mathbf{Z}_1,\ldots,\mathbf{Z}_k \right\}$ are independent and identically distributed n-dimensional circular complex normal random vectors with $\mu = 0$, then the random squared norm

$$Q = \sum_{j=1}^k \mathbf{Z}_j^{\mathrm H} \mathbf{Z}_j = \sum_{j=1}^k \| \mathbf{Z}_j \|^2$$

has the generalized chi-squared distribution and the random matrix

$$W = \sum_{j=1}^k \mathbf{Z}_j \mathbf{Z}_j^{\mathrm H}$$

has the complex Wishart distribution with $k$ degrees of freedom. This distribution can be described by density function

$$f(w) = \frac{\det(\Gamma^{-1})^k\det(w)^{k-n}}{\pi^{n(n-1)/2}\prod_{j=1}^k(k-j)!}\
e^{-\operatorname{tr}(\Gamma^{-1}w)}$$

where $k \ge n$, and $w$ is a $n \times n$ nonnegative-definite matrix.

== See also ==
- Complex normal ratio distribution
- Directional statistics § Distribution of the mean (polar form)
- Normal distribution
- Multivariate normal distribution (a complex normal distribution is a bivariate normal distribution)
- Generalized chi-squared distribution
- Wishart distribution
- Complex random variable
