= Nakagami distribution =

Statistical distribution

Nakagami
- Probability density function

- Cumulative distribution function
- Parameters: $m\text{ or } \mu \geq 0.5$ shape (real) $\Omega \text{ or } \omega > 0$ scale (real)
- Support: $x > 0\!$
- PDF: $\frac{2m^m}{\Gamma(m)\Omega^m} x^{2m-1} \exp\left(-\frac{m}{\Omega}x^2 \right)$
- CDF: $\frac{\gamma \left(m,\frac{m}{\Omega} x^2\right)}{\Gamma(m)}$
- Mean: $\frac{\Gamma(m+\frac{1}{2})}{\Gamma(m)}\left(\frac{\Omega}{m}\right)^{1/2}$
- Median: No simple closed form
- Mode: $\left(\frac{(2m-1)\Omega}{2m}\right)^{1/2}$
- Variance: $\Omega\left(1-\frac{1}{m}\left(\frac{\Gamma(m+\frac{1}{2})}{\Gamma(m)}\right)^2\right)$

The Nakagami distribution or the Nakagami-m distribution is a probability distribution related to the gamma distribution. The family of Nakagami distributions has two parameters: a shape parameter $m\geq 1/2$ and a scale parameter $\Omega > 0$. It is used to model physical phenomena such as those found in medical ultrasound imaging, communications engineering, meteorology, hydrology, multimedia, and seismology.

== Characterization ==
Its probability density function (pdf) is

$$f(x;\,m,\Omega) = \frac{2m^m}{\Gamma(m)\Omega^m}x^{2m-1}\exp\left(-\frac{m}{\Omega}x^2\right) \text{ for } x\geq 0.$$

where $m\geq 1/2$ and $\Omega>0$.

Its cumulative distribution function (CDF) is

$$F(x;\,m,\Omega) = \frac{\gamma\left(m, \frac{m}{\Omega}x^2\right)}{\Gamma(m)} = P\left(m, \frac{m}{\Omega}x^2\right)$$

where P is the regularized (lower) incomplete gamma function.

== Parameterization ==
The parameters $m$ and $\Omega$ are

$$m = \frac{\left( \operatorname{E} [X^2] \right)^2 }
{\operatorname{Var} [X^2]},$$

and

$$\Omega = \operatorname{E} [X^2].$$

No closed form solution exists for the median of this distribution, although special cases do exist, such as $\sqrt{\Omega \ln(2)}$ when m = 1. For practical purposes the median would have to be calculated as the 50th-percentile of the observations.

== Parameter estimation ==
An alternative way of fitting the distribution is to re-parametrize $\Omega$ as σ = Ω/m.

Given independent observations $X_1=x_1,\ldots,X_n=x_n$ from the Nakagami distribution, the likelihood function is

$$L( \sigma, m) = \left( \frac{2}{\Gamma(m)\sigma^m} \right)^n \left( \prod_{i=1}^n x_i\right)^{2m-1} \exp\left(-\frac{\sum_{i=1}^n x_i^2} \sigma \right).$$

Its logarithm is

$$\ell(\sigma, m) = \log L(\sigma,m) = -n \log \Gamma(m) - nm\log\sigma + (2m-1) \sum_{i=1}^n \log x_i - \frac{ \sum_{i=1}^n x_i^2} \sigma.$$

Therefore

$$\begin{align}
\frac{\partial\ell}{\partial\sigma} = \frac{-nm\sigma+\sum_{i=1}^n x_i^2}{\sigma^2} \quad \text{and} \quad \frac{\partial\ell}{\partial m} = -n\frac{\Gamma'(m)}{\Gamma(m)} -n \log\sigma + 2\sum_{i=1}^n \log x_i.
\end{align}$$

These derivatives vanish only when

$$\sigma= \frac{\sum_{i=1}^n x_i^2}{nm}$$

and the value of m for which the derivative with respect to m vanishes is found by numerical methods including the Newton–Raphson method.

It can be shown that at the critical point a global maximum is attained, so the critical point is the maximum-likelihood estimate of (m,σ). Because of the equivariance of maximum-likelihood estimation, a maximum likelihood estimate for Ω is obtained as well.

== Random variate generation ==
The Nakagami distribution is related to the gamma distribution. In particular, given a random variable $Y \, \sim \textrm{Gamma}(k, \theta)$, it is possible to obtain a random variable $X \, \sim \textrm{Nakagami} (m, \Omega)$, by setting $k=m$, $\theta=\Omega / m$, and taking the square root of $Y$:

$$X = \sqrt{Y}. \,$$

Alternatively, the Nakagami distribution $f(y; \,m,\Omega)$ can be generated from the chi distribution with parameter $k$ set to $2m$ and then following it by a scaling transformation of random variables. That is, a Nakagami random variable $X$ is generated by a simple scaling transformation on a chi-distributed random variable $Y \sim \chi(2m)$ as below.

$$X = \sqrt{(\Omega / 2 m)}Y .$$

For a chi-distribution, the degrees of freedom $2m$ must be an integer, but for Nakagami the $m$ can be any real number greater than 1/2. This is the critical difference and accordingly, Nakagami-m is viewed as a generalization of chi-distribution, similar to a gamma distribution being considered as a generalization of chi-squared distributions.

== History and applications ==
The Nakagami distribution is relatively new, being first proposed in 1960 by Minoru Nakagami as a mathematical model for small-scale fading in long-distance high-frequency radio wave propagation. It has been used to model attenuation of Wireless signals traversing multiple paths and to study the impact of fading channels on wireless communications.

== Related distributions ==
- Restricting m to the unit interval (q = m; 0 < q < 1) defines the Nakagami-q distribution, also known as Hoyt distribution, first studied by R.S. Hoyt in the 1940s. In particular, the radius around the true mean in a bivariate normal random variable, re-written in polar coordinates (radius and angle), follows a Hoyt distribution. Equivalently, the modulus of a complex normal random variable also does.
- With 2m = k, the Nakagami distribution gives a scaled chi distribution.
- With $m = \tfrac 1 2$, the Nakagami distribution gives a scaled half-normal distribution.
- A Nakagami distribution is a particular form of generalized gamma distribution, with p = 2 and d = 2m.

== See also ==
- Gamma distribution
- Sub-Gaussian distribution
