= Complex random vector =

In probability theory and statistics, a complex random vector is typically a tuple of complex-valued random variables, and generally is a random variable taking values in a vector space over the field of complex numbers. If $Z_1,\ldots,Z_n$ are complex-valued random variables, then the n-tuple $\left( Z_1,\ldots,Z_n \right)$ is a complex random vector. Complex random variables can always be considered as pairs of real random vectors: their real and imaginary parts.

Some concepts of real random vectors have a straightforward generalization to complex random vectors. For example, the definition of the mean of a complex random vector. Other concepts are unique to complex random vectors.

Applications of complex random vectors are found in digital signal processing.

== Definition ==
A complex random vector $\mathbf{Z} = (Z_1,\ldots,Z_n)^T$ on the probability space $(\Omega,\mathcal{F},P)$ is a function $\mathbf{Z} \colon \Omega \rightarrow \mathbb{C}^n$ such that the vector $(\Re{(Z_1)},\Im{(Z_1)},\ldots,\Re{(Z_n)},\Im{(Z_n)})^T$ is a real random vector on $(\Omega,\mathcal{F},P)$ where $\Re{(z)}$ denotes the real part of $z$ and $\Im{(z)}$ denotes the imaginary part of $z$.

== Cumulative distribution function ==
The generalization of the cumulative distribution function from real to complex random variables is not obvious because expressions of the form $P(Z \leq 1+3i)$ make no sense. However expressions of the form $P(\Re{(Z)} \leq 1, \Im{(Z)} \leq 3)$ make sense. Therefore, the cumulative distribution function $F_{\mathbf{Z}} : \mathbb{C}^n \mapsto [0,1]$ of a random vector $\mathbf{Z}=(Z_1,...,Z_n)^T$ is defined as

$F_{\mathbf{Z}}(\mathbf{z}) = \operatorname{P}(\Re{(Z_1)} \leq \Re{(z_1)} , \Im{(Z_1)} \leq \Im{(z_1)},\ldots,\Re{(Z_n)} \leq \Re{(z_n)} , \Im{(Z_n)} \leq \Im{(z_n)})$	Eq.1

where $\mathbf{z} = (z_1,...,z_n)^T$.

== Expectation ==
As in the real case the expectation (also called expected value) of a complex random vector is taken component-wise.

$\operatorname{E}[\mathbf{Z}] = (\operatorname{E}[Z_1],\ldots,\operatorname{E}[Z_n])^T$	Eq.2

== Covariance matrix and pseudo-covariance matrix ==
The covariance matrix (also called second central moment) $\operatorname{K}_{\mathbf{Z}\mathbf{Z}}$ contains the covariances between all pairs of components. The covariance matrix of an $n \times 1$ random vector is an $n \times n$ matrix whose $(i,j)$^{th} element is the covariance between the i^{th} and the j^{th} random variables. Unlike in the case of real random variables, the covariance between two random variables involves the complex conjugate of one of the two. Thus the covariance matrix is a Hermitian matrix.

$$\begin{align}
& \operatorname{K}_{\mathbf{Z}\mathbf{Z}}
=
\operatorname{cov}[\mathbf{Z},\mathbf{Z}]
=
\operatorname{E}[(\mathbf{Z}-\operatorname{E}[\mathbf{Z}]){(\mathbf{Z}-\operatorname{E}[\mathbf{Z}])}^H]
=
\operatorname{E}[\mathbf{Z}\mathbf{Z}^H]-\operatorname{E}[\mathbf{Z}]\operatorname{E}[\mathbf{Z}^H] \\[12pt]
\end{align}$$

Eq.3

$$\operatorname{K}_{\mathbf{Z}\mathbf{Z}}=
\begin{bmatrix}
\mathrm{E}[(Z_1 - \operatorname{E}[Z_1])\overline{(Z_1 - \operatorname{E}[Z_1])}] & \mathrm{E}[(Z_1 - \operatorname{E}[Z_1])\overline{(Z_2 - \operatorname{E}[Z_2])}] & \cdots & \mathrm{E}[(Z_1 - \operatorname{E}[Z_1])\overline{(Z_n - \operatorname{E}[Z_n])}] \\ \\
\mathrm{E}[(Z_2 - \operatorname{E}[Z_2])\overline{(Z_1 - \operatorname{E}[Z_1])}] & \mathrm{E}[(Z_2 - \operatorname{E}[Z_2])\overline{(Z_2 - \operatorname{E}[Z_2])}] & \cdots & \mathrm{E}[(Z_2 - \operatorname{E}[Z_2])\overline{(Z_n - \operatorname{E}[Z_n])}] \\ \\
\vdots & \vdots & \ddots & \vdots \\ \\
\mathrm{E}[(Z_n - \operatorname{E}[Z_n])\overline{(Z_1 - \operatorname{E}[Z_1])}] & \mathrm{E}[(Z_n - \operatorname{E}[Z_n])\overline{(Z_2 - \operatorname{E}[Z_2])}] & \cdots & \mathrm{E}[(Z_n - \operatorname{E}[Z_n])\overline{(Z_n - \operatorname{E}[Z_n])}]
\end{bmatrix}$$

The pseudo-covariance matrix (also called relation matrix) is defined replacing Hermitian transposition by transposition in the definition above.

$\operatorname{J}_{\mathbf{Z}\mathbf{Z}} = \operatorname{cov}[\mathbf{Z},\overline{\mathbf{Z}}] = \operatorname{E}[(\mathbf{Z}-\operatorname{E}[\mathbf{Z}]){(\mathbf{Z}-\operatorname{E}[\mathbf{Z}])}^T] = \operatorname{E}[\mathbf{Z}\mathbf{Z}^T]-\operatorname{E}[\mathbf{Z}]\operatorname{E}[\mathbf{Z}^T]$

Eq.4

$$\operatorname{J}_{\mathbf{Z}\mathbf{Z}}=
\begin{bmatrix}
\mathrm{E}[(Z_1 - \operatorname{E}[Z_1])(Z_1 - \operatorname{E}[Z_1])] & \mathrm{E}[(Z_1 - \operatorname{E}[Z_1])(Z_2 - \operatorname{E}[Z_2])] & \cdots & \mathrm{E}[(Z_1 - \operatorname{E}[Z_1])(Z_n - \operatorname{E}[Z_n])] \\ \\
\mathrm{E}[(Z_2 - \operatorname{E}[Z_2])(Z_1 - \operatorname{E}[Z_1])] & \mathrm{E}[(Z_2 - \operatorname{E}[Z_2])(Z_2 - \operatorname{E}[Z_2])] & \cdots & \mathrm{E}[(Z_2 - \operatorname{E}[Z_2])(Z_n - \operatorname{E}[Z_n])] \\ \\
\vdots & \vdots & \ddots & \vdots \\ \\
\mathrm{E}[(Z_n - \operatorname{E}[Z_n])(Z_1 - \operatorname{E}[Z_1])] & \mathrm{E}[(Z_n - \operatorname{E}[Z_n])(Z_2 - \operatorname{E}[Z_2])] & \cdots & \mathrm{E}[(Z_n - \operatorname{E}[Z_n])(Z_n - \operatorname{E}[Z_n])]
\end{bmatrix}$$

Properties

The covariance matrix is a hermitian matrix, i.e.

$$\operatorname{K}_{\mathbf{Z}\mathbf{Z}}^H = \operatorname{K}_{\mathbf{Z}\mathbf{Z}}$$.

The pseudo-covariance matrix is a symmetric matrix, i.e.

$$\operatorname{J}_{\mathbf{Z}\mathbf{Z}}^T = \operatorname{J}_{\mathbf{Z}\mathbf{Z}}$$.

The covariance matrix is a positive semidefinite matrix, i.e.

$$\mathbf{a}^H \operatorname{K}_{\mathbf{Z}\mathbf{Z}} \mathbf{a} \ge 0 \quad \text{for all } \mathbf{a} \in \mathbb{C}^n$$.

=== Covariance matrices of real and imaginary parts ===
By decomposing the random vector $\mathbf{Z}$ into its real part $\mathbf{X} = \Re{(\mathbf{Z})}$ and imaginary part $\mathbf{Y} = \Im{(\mathbf{Z})}$ (i.e. $\mathbf{Z}=\mathbf{X}+i\mathbf{Y}$), the pair $(\mathbf{X},\mathbf{Y})$ has a covariance matrix of the form:

$$\begin{bmatrix}
\operatorname{K}_{\mathbf{X}\mathbf{X}} & \operatorname{K}_{\mathbf{X}\mathbf{Y}} \\
\operatorname{K}_{\mathbf{Y}\mathbf{X}} & \operatorname{K}_{\mathbf{Y}\mathbf{Y}}
\end{bmatrix}$$

The matrices $\operatorname{K}_{\mathbf{Z}\mathbf{Z}}$ and $\operatorname{J}_{\mathbf{Z}\mathbf{Z}}$ can be related to the covariance matrices of $\mathbf{X}$ and $\mathbf{Y}$ via the following expressions:

$$\begin{align}
& \operatorname{K}_{\mathbf{X}\mathbf{X}} = \operatorname{E}[(\mathbf{X}-\operatorname{E}[\mathbf{X}])(\mathbf{X}-\operatorname{E}[\mathbf{X}])^\mathrm T] = \tfrac{1}{2}\operatorname{Re}(\operatorname{K}_{\mathbf{Z}\mathbf{Z}} + \operatorname{J}_{\mathbf{Z}\mathbf{Z}}) \\
& \operatorname{K}_{\mathbf{Y}\mathbf{Y}} = \operatorname{E}[(\mathbf{Y}-\operatorname{E}[\mathbf{Y}])(\mathbf{Y}-\operatorname{E}[\mathbf{Y}])^\mathrm T] = \tfrac{1}{2}\operatorname{Re}(\operatorname{K}_{\mathbf{Z}\mathbf{Z}} - \operatorname{J}_{\mathbf{Z}\mathbf{Z}}) \\
& \operatorname{K}_{\mathbf{Y}\mathbf{X}} = \operatorname{E}[(\mathbf{Y}-\operatorname{E}[\mathbf{Y}])(\mathbf{X}-\operatorname{E}[\mathbf{X}])^\mathrm T] = \tfrac{1}{2}\operatorname{Im}(\operatorname{J}_{\mathbf{Z}\mathbf{Z}} + \operatorname{K}_{\mathbf{Z}\mathbf{Z}}) \\
& \operatorname{K}_{\mathbf{X}\mathbf{Y}} = \operatorname{E}[(\mathbf{X}-\operatorname{E}[\mathbf{X}])(\mathbf{Y}-\operatorname{E}[\mathbf{Y}])^\mathrm T] = \tfrac{1}{2}\operatorname{Im}(\operatorname{J}_{\mathbf{Z}\mathbf{Z}} -\operatorname{K}_{\mathbf{Z}\mathbf{Z}}) \\
\end{align}$$

Conversely:

$$\begin{align}
& \operatorname{K}_{\mathbf{Z}\mathbf{Z}} = \operatorname{K}_{\mathbf{X}\mathbf{X}} + \operatorname{K}_{\mathbf{Y}\mathbf{Y}} + i(\operatorname{K}_{\mathbf{Y}\mathbf{X}} - \operatorname{K}_{\mathbf{X}\mathbf{Y}}) \\
& \operatorname{J}_{\mathbf{Z}\mathbf{Z}} = \operatorname{K}_{\mathbf{X}\mathbf{X}} - \operatorname{K}_{\mathbf{Y}\mathbf{Y}} + i(\operatorname{K}_{\mathbf{Y}\mathbf{X}} + \operatorname{K}_{\mathbf{X}\mathbf{Y}})
\end{align}$$

== Cross-covariance matrix and pseudo-cross-covariance matrix ==
The cross-covariance matrix between two complex random vectors $\mathbf{Z},\mathbf{W}$ is defined as:

$\operatorname{K}_{\mathbf{Z}\mathbf{W}} = \operatorname{cov}[\mathbf{Z},\mathbf{W}] = \operatorname{E}[(\mathbf{Z}-\operatorname{E}[\mathbf{Z}]){(\mathbf{W}-\operatorname{E}[\mathbf{W}])}^H] = \operatorname{E}[\mathbf{Z}\mathbf{W}^H]-\operatorname{E}[\mathbf{Z}]\operatorname{E}[\mathbf{W}^H]$	Eq.5

$$\operatorname{K}_{\mathbf{Z}\mathbf{W}} =
\begin{bmatrix}
\mathrm{E}[(Z_1 - \operatorname{E}[Z_1])\overline{(W_1 - \operatorname{E}[W_1])}] & \mathrm{E}[(Z_1 - \operatorname{E}[Z_1])\overline{(W_2 - \operatorname{E}[W_2])}] & \cdots & \mathrm{E}[(Z_1 - \operatorname{E}[Z_1])\overline{(W_n - \operatorname{E}[W_n])}] \\ \\
\mathrm{E}[(Z_2 - \operatorname{E}[Z_2])\overline{(W_1 - \operatorname{E}[W_1])}] & \mathrm{E}[(Z_2 - \operatorname{E}[Z_2])\overline{(W_2 - \operatorname{E}[W_2])}] & \cdots & \mathrm{E}[(Z_2 - \operatorname{E}[Z_2])\overline{(W_n - \operatorname{E}[W_n])}] \\ \\
\vdots & \vdots & \ddots & \vdots \\ \\
\mathrm{E}[(Z_n - \operatorname{E}[Z_n])\overline{(W_1 - \operatorname{E}[W_1])}] & \mathrm{E}[(Z_n - \operatorname{E}[Z_n])\overline{(W_2 - \operatorname{E}[W_2])}] & \cdots & \mathrm{E}[(Z_n - \operatorname{E}[Z_n])\overline{(W_n - \operatorname{E}[W_n])}]
\end{bmatrix}$$

And the pseudo-cross-covariance matrix is defined as:

$\operatorname{J}_{\mathbf{Z}\mathbf{W}} = \operatorname{cov}[\mathbf{Z},\overline{\mathbf{W}}] = \operatorname{E}[(\mathbf{Z}-\operatorname{E}[\mathbf{Z}]){(\mathbf{W}-\operatorname{E}[\mathbf{W}])}^T] = \operatorname{E}[\mathbf{Z}\mathbf{W}^T]-\operatorname{E}[\mathbf{Z}]\operatorname{E}[\mathbf{W}^T]$	Eq.6

$$\operatorname{J}_{\mathbf{Z}\mathbf{W}} =
\begin{bmatrix}
\mathrm{E}[(Z_1 - \operatorname{E}[Z_1])(W_1 - \operatorname{E}[W_1])] & \mathrm{E}[(Z_1 - \operatorname{E}[Z_1])(W_2 - \operatorname{E}[W_2])] & \cdots & \mathrm{E}[(Z_1 - \operatorname{E}[Z_1])(W_n - \operatorname{E}[W_n])] \\ \\
\mathrm{E}[(Z_2 - \operatorname{E}[Z_2])(W_1 - \operatorname{E}[W_1])] & \mathrm{E}[(Z_2 - \operatorname{E}[Z_2])(W_2 - \operatorname{E}[W_2])] & \cdots & \mathrm{E}[(Z_2 - \operatorname{E}[Z_2])(W_n - \operatorname{E}[W_n])] \\ \\
\vdots & \vdots & \ddots & \vdots \\ \\
\mathrm{E}[(Z_n - \operatorname{E}[Z_n])(W_1 - \operatorname{E}[W_1])] & \mathrm{E}[(Z_n - \operatorname{E}[Z_n])(W_2 - \operatorname{E}[W_2])] & \cdots & \mathrm{E}[(Z_n - \operatorname{E}[Z_n])(W_n - \operatorname{E}[W_n])]
\end{bmatrix}$$

Two complex random vectors $\mathbf{Z}$ and $\mathbf{W}$ are called uncorrelated if

$$\operatorname{K}_{\mathbf{Z}\mathbf{W}}=\operatorname{J}_{\mathbf{Z}\mathbf{W}}=0$$.

== Independence ==
Two complex random vectors $\mathbf{Z}=(Z_1,...,Z_m)^T$ and $\mathbf{W}=(W_1,...,W_n)^T$ are called independent if

$F_{\mathbf{Z,W}}(\mathbf{z,w}) = F_{\mathbf{Z}}(\mathbf{z}) \cdot F_{\mathbf{W}}(\mathbf{w}) \quad \text{for all } \mathbf{z},\mathbf{w}$	Eq.7

where $F_{\mathbf{Z}}(\mathbf{z})$ and $F_{\mathbf{W}}(\mathbf{w})$ denote the cumulative distribution functions of $\mathbf{Z}$ and $\mathbf{W}$ as defined in Eq.1 and $F_{\mathbf{Z,W}}(\mathbf{z,w})$ denotes their joint cumulative distribution function. Independence of $\mathbf{Z}$ and $\mathbf{W}$ is often denoted by $\mathbf{Z} \perp\!\!\!\perp \mathbf{W}$. Written component-wise, $\mathbf{Z}$ and $\mathbf{W}$ are called independent if

$$F_{Z_1,\ldots,Z_m,W_1,\ldots,W_n}(z_1,\ldots,z_m,w_1,\ldots,w_n) = F_{Z_1,\ldots,Z_m}(z_1,\ldots,z_m) \cdot F_{W_1,\ldots,W_n}(w_1,\ldots,w_n) \quad \text{for all } z_1,\ldots,z_m,w_1,\ldots,w_n$$.

== Circular symmetry ==
A complex random vector $\mathbf{Z}$ is called circularly symmetric if for every deterministic $\varphi \in [-\pi,\pi)$ the distribution of $e^{\mathrm i \varphi}\mathbf{Z}$ equals the distribution of $\mathbf{Z}$.

Properties

- The expectation of a circularly symmetric complex random vector is either zero or it is not defined.
- The pseudo-covariance matrix of a circularly symmetric complex random vector is zero.

== Proper complex random vectors ==
A complex random vector $\mathbf{Z}$ is called proper if the following three conditions are all satisfied:

- $\operatorname{E}[\mathbf{Z}] = 0$ (zero mean)
- $\operatorname{var}[Z_1] < \infty , \ldots , \operatorname{var}[Z_n] < \infty$ (all components have finite variance)
- $\operatorname{E}[\mathbf{Z}\mathbf{Z}^T] = 0$

Two complex random vectors $\mathbf{Z},\mathbf{W}$ are called jointly proper if the composite random vector $(Z_1,Z_2,\ldots,Z_m,W_1,W_2,\ldots,W_n)^T$ is proper.

Properties

- A complex random vector $\mathbf{Z}$ is proper if, and only if, for all (deterministic) vectors $\mathbf{c} \in \mathbb{C}^n$ the complex random variable $\mathbf{c}^T \mathbf{Z}$ is proper.
- Linear transformations of proper complex random vectors are proper, i.e. if $\mathbf{Z}$ is a proper random vectors with $n$ components and $A$ is a deterministic $m \times n$ matrix, then the complex random vector $A \mathbf{Z}$ is also proper.
- Every circularly symmetric complex random vector with finite variance of all its components is proper.
- There are proper complex random vectors that are not circularly symmetric.
- A real random vector is proper if and only if it is constant.
- Two jointly proper complex random vectors are uncorrelated if and only if their covariance matrix is zero, i.e. if $\operatorname{K}_{\mathbf{Z}\mathbf{W}} = 0$.

== Cauchy–Schwarz inequality ==
The Cauchy–Schwarz inequality for complex random vectors is

$$\left| \operatorname{E}[\mathbf{Z}^H \mathbf{W}] \right|^2 \leq \operatorname{E}[\mathbf{Z}^H \mathbf{Z}] \operatorname{E}[|\mathbf{W}^H \mathbf{W}|]$$.

== Characteristic function ==
The characteristic function of a complex random vector $\mathbf{Z}$ with $n$ components is a function $\mathbb{C}^n \to \mathbb{C}$ defined by:

$$\varphi_{\mathbf{Z}}(\mathbf{\omega}) = \operatorname{E} \left [ e^{i\Re{(\mathbf{\omega}^H \mathbf{Z})}} \right ] = \operatorname{E} \left [ e^{i( \Re{(\omega_1)}\Re{(Z_1)} + \Im{(\omega_1)}\Im{(Z_1)} + \cdots + \Re{(\omega_n)}\Re{(Z_n)} + \Im{(\omega_n)}\Im{(Z_n)} )} \right ]$$

== See also ==
- Complex normal distribution
- Complex random variable (scalar case)
