= Horn angle =

Type of curvilinear angle

In mathematics, a horn angle, also called a cornicular angle, is a type of curvilinear angle defined as the angle formed between a circle and a straight line tangent to it, or, more generally, the angle formed between two curves at a point where they are tangent to each other.

== See also ==
- Angle
- History of geometry
- Non-Archimedean geometry
