= Regularized canonical correlation analysis =

Regularized canonical correlation analysis is a way of using ridge regression to solve the singularity problem in the cross-covariance matrices of canonical correlation analysis. By converting $\operatorname{cov}(X, X)$ and $\operatorname{cov}(Y, Y)$ into $\operatorname{cov}(X, X) + \lambda I_X$ and $\operatorname{cov}(Y, Y) + \lambda I_Y$, it ensures that the above matrices will have reliable inverses.

The idea probably dates back to Hrishikesh D. Vinod's publication in 1976 where he called it "Canonical ridge". It has been suggested for use in the analysis of functional neuroimaging data as such data are often singular. It is possible to compute the regularized canonical vectors in the lower-dimensional space.
