= Hrishikesh Vinod =

Economist

Hrishikesh D. Vinod
- Education: (Bcom) Brihan Maharashtra College of Commerce; Pune University (M.A.) Delhi School of Economics; Delhi University (PhD) Harvard University
- Occupations: Economist; professor
- Awards: Benemerenti medal
- Scientific career
- Fields: Economics
- Workplaces: Harvard University; Fordham University
- Thesis: Variable Returns to Scale and Non-linearization of the Leontief Input-Output System (1966)

Hrishikesh D. Vinod is an Indian-American economist who has been a professor of economics at Fordham University in New York since 1982. In March 2022, he was awarded the Benemerenti medal for his 40 years of service at Fordham University.

== Early life and education ==
Vinod was born and raised in India in a Marathi speaking family. In 1959, he obtained a Bachelor of Commerce from the Brihan Maharashtra College of Commerce in the city of Pune. Vinod received his MA degree from the Delhi School of Economics in 1961. Later he won the IBM Fellowship at Harvard University to study economics.He received his PhD in economics from there in 1966.

== Faculty career ==
Vinod began his career as a teaching fellow at Harvard University in 1963. He was an assistant professor from 1965 to 1966 at the California State University, Fullerton then at the University of Iowa in 1966. Vinod served as a visiting professor of economics in the fall of 1986 at the University of Western Ontario and then at the University of Manchester in the summer of 1987. Since 1982, he has been a professor of economics at Fordham University in New York.

== Research ==
In 1969, Vinod was the first to solve the optimal clustering problems with integer programming and use inventory theoretic demand analysis. In 1976, he invented canonical ridge crucial for "regularization" in modern data science. He has pioneered a maximum entropy bootstrapping method for statistical inference for time series and new nonparametric tools for causality assessment.

He has co-edited volumes 9, 41, and 42 of the Handbook of Statistics with statistician C. R. Rao. In a 2022 paper published by the Journal of Quantitative Economics, Vinod pioneered a maximum entropy bootstrap method for time series and used it to perform Rao-Blackwellization. According to the Research Papers in Economics (RePEc), Vinod is ranked among the top 5% of economists worldwide in 14 out of 38 different categories, including the number of journal pages weighted by the recursive impact factor.

== Bibliography ==
Vinod has published more than 200 research papers and books on economics including:

=== Selected articles ===
- Vinod, Hrishikesh D. (1969). "Integer Programming and the Theory of Grouping". Journal of the American Statistical Association. 64 (326): 506–519. doi:10.2307/2283635. JSTOR 2283635.
- Baumol, W. J.; Vinod, H. D. (1970). "An Inventory Theoretic Model of Freight Transport Demand". Management Science. 16 (7): 413–421. doi:10.1287/mnsc.16.7.413. ISSN 0025-1909.
- Vinod, H.D. (1976). "Canonical ridge and econometrics of joint production". Journal of Econometrics. 4 (2): 147–166. doi:10.1016/0304-4076(76)90010-5.
- Vinod, Hrishikesh D. (1976). "Application of New Ridge Regression Methods to a Study of Bell System Scale Economies". Journal of the American Statistical Association. 71 (356): 835–841. doi:10.1080/01621459.1976.10480955. ISSN 0162-1459.
- Vinod, Hrishikesh D. (1978). "A Survey of Ridge Regression and Related Techniques for Improvements over Ordinary Least Squares". The Review of Economics and Statistics. 60 (1): 121–131. doi:10.2307/1924340. JSTOR 1924340.
- Harrison, Glenn W.; Vinod, H. D. (1992). "The Sensitivity Analysis of Applied General Equilibrium Models: Completely Randomized Factorial Sampling Designs". The Review of Economics and Statistics. 74 (2): 357. doi:10.2307/2109672. JSTOR 2109672.
- McCullough, B. D; Vinod, H. D (1999-06-01). "The Numerical Reliability of Econometric Software". Journal of Economic Literature. 37 (2): 633–665. doi:10.1257/jel.37.2.633. ISSN 0022-0515.
- McCullough, B. D; Vinod, H. D (2003-05-01). "Verifying the Solution from a Nonlinear Solver: A Case Study". American Economic Review. 93 (3): 873–892. doi:10.1257/000282803322157133. ISSN 0002-8282.
- Vinod, Hrishikesh D.; López-de-Lacalle, Javier (2009). "Maximum Entropy Bootstrap for Time Series: The meboot R Package". Journal of Statistical Software. 29 (5). doi:10.18637/jss.v029.i05. ISSN 1548-7660.
- Hrishikesh D Vinod (2024). "New Axioms for Dependence Measurement and Powerful Tests". arXiv:2412.00066 [stat.ME].
- Vinod, Hrishikesh D.; Deodhar, Satish Y. (2024-01-23). "Hindu Economic Ethics". The Oxford Handbook of Religion and Economic Ethics. Oxford University Press. doi:10.1093/oxfordhb/9780192894328.013.1. ISBN 978-0-19-289432-8.

=== Selected books ===
- Vinod, Hrishikesh D.; Ullah, Aman (1981). Recent advances in regression methods. New York Basel: M. Dekker. ISBN 0-8247-1574-8.
- Vinod, Hrishikesh D. (2010). Advances in Social Science Research Using R. Lecture Notes in Statistics. Vol. 196. NY: Springer New York. doi:10.1007/978-1-4419-1764-5. ISBN 978-1-4419-1764-5.
- Vinod, Hrishikesh D. (2011). Hands-on Matrix Algebra Using R. Singapore ; Hackensack, N. J: World Scientific Publishing Company. ISBN 978-981-4313-69-8. OCLC 639159335.
- Vinod, Hrishikesh D. (2022). Hands-On Intermediate Econometrics Using R: Templates for Learning Quantitative Methods and R Software (Second ed.). New Jersey: World Scientific Publishing Company. ISBN 978-981-12-5617-2.
