= Clock position =

Relative direction using a dial

The red plane has a clock position of "two o'clock" from the perspective of the blue plane.

A clock position, or clock bearing, is the direction of an object observed from a vehicle, typically a vessel or an aircraft, relative to the orientation of the vehicle to the observer. The vehicle must be considered to have a front, a back, a left side and a right side. These quarters may have specialized names, such as bow and stern for a vessel, or nose and tail for an aircraft. The observer then measures or observes the angle made by the intersection of the line of sight to the longitudinal axis, the dimension of length, of the vessel, using the clock analogy.

In this analogy, the observer imagines the vessel located on a horizontal clock face with the front at 12:00. Neglecting the length of the vessel, and presuming that he is at the bow, he observes the time number lying on the line of sight. For example, 12 o'clock means directly ahead, 3 o'clock means directly to the right, 6 o'clock means directly behind, and 9 o'clock means directly to the left.

The clock system is not confined to transportation. It has general application to circumstances in which the location of one object with respect to another must be systematized.

== Uses ==
=== As a relative bearing ===
This is a system of denoting impromptu relative bearing widely used in practical navigation to give the position of an observed object readily and comprehensibly. "Relative" means that it does not state or imply any compass directions whatsoever. The vessel can be pointed in any direction. The clock numbers are relative to the direction in which the vessel points. The angular distance between adjacent clock numbers is 30 degrees, a round unit that simplifies mathematical juggling. A quick clock number can be shouted by a lookout, whereas after a calculation and comparison of compass points, which might be unknown anyway, it might be too late for the vessel to avoid danger.

As an example of a standard use, the clock position of every approaching vessel is monitored. If the clock number for the observed vessel does not change, it is on a collision course for the observer vessel, as vessels that pass by must change relative bearing. In warfare the clock system is especially useful in drawing attention to enemy locations.

The clock system is easily converted into a 360 degree system for more precise denotation. One bearing, or point, is termed an azimuth. The convention is that of analytic geometry: the y-axis at zero degrees is the longitudinal axis of the vehicle. Angles grow larger in the clockwise direction. Thus, directly to port is at 270 degrees. Negative angles are not used. In navigational contexts, the bearing must be stated as 3 digits: 010 (not so in other contexts). These circles are not to be confused with latitude and longitude, or with any sort of compass reading, which are not relative to the vehicle, but to the magnetic and spin axes of the Earth.

=== As a true bearing ===
For maritime and aviation applications, the clock bearing is almost always a relative bearing; i.e., the angle stated or implied is angular distance from “12 o clock” which is defined as the longitudinal axis of the vessel or imaginary vessel to the bearing. The clock direction is given as one might read the “time” from a giant clock laid horizontally below the object of interest.

If such a clock were aligned so that its 12 o clock always aligned with either true north or south, it could be used as reference for determining absolute bearing or true bearing.

For example, a physical clock laid flat on the ground can be oriented so that its 12 o clock index points in the direction of the noon sun. In this case, the other positions on the clock face will correlate to absolute cardinal points of the compass.

=== Clock compass myth ===
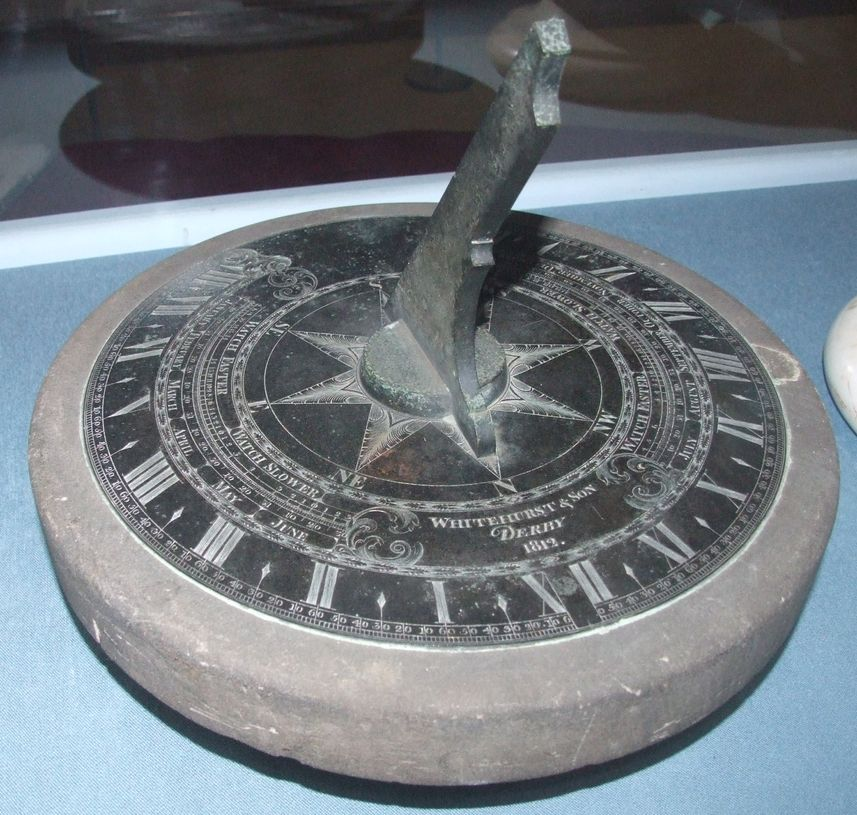
Horizontal sundial of 1812 showing that the clock positions in Roman numerals on the outside dial differ from the points of a compass rose on the inside dial. The XII position is true north and the line from VI to VI is East-West

A myth exists that a running clock or wristwatch showing local mean time can easily be oriented in this way using a procedure based only on knowing the position of the sun. The Boy Scout Handbook included such a procedure as recently as 2016.

This myth arises from the intuitive notion that the sun “rises in the East” and “sets in the West” and (in the Northern Hemisphere) “lies to the south at noon”, coupled with a faulty assumption that the sun progresses around the compass dial at a constant rate throughout the day.

Unfortunately the real behavior of the sun is more complex than commonly understood.

The bearing from the observer to the sun is called the “solar azimuth”. There are different conventions for when this value is “zero”, for instance if one chooses the idea of “azimuth” to behave similarly to the idea of “bearing” on a map, true north will be defined as 0 degrees, increasing clockwise through all the points of the compass, passing through 180 degrees when facing South, continuing all the way to 360 degrees after a full rotation. Other conventions are possible: some astronomical formulas are based on the opposite convention that the solar azimuth is zero at local noon, at which time observers in the Northern Hemisphere would say the sun lies to the South.

A correct formula for azimuth according to the US Naval Observatory can be written as:

tan(A) = sin(ω) / (cos(ω)·sin(φ) - tan(δ)·cos(φ))

Where

A is Azimuth angle measured clockwise from south: due west is +90° , due East is -90°

φ is an angle corresponding to your latitude (if you are at “48 degrees North latitude” then the angle is +48 °)

δ is an angle corresponding to the solar declination for today’s date (this is an angle between -23.45° on the winter solstice and +23.45° on the summer solstice, zero on the equinoxes, related to the axial tilt of the earth relative to the plane of its orbit around the sun, easy to look up from a table)

ω is an angle corresponding to time of day. This is known as “hour angle” and is calculated like this: if H is the number of hours AFTER NOON (where H is negative before noon) then ω = H * 15°

Clearly this is more complex than naive calculations that assume azimuth is merely equal to hour angle: at a minimum these methods do not factor in latitude or date.

Additionally, most clocks measure “local mean time” which generally differs from “local solar time”. Converting normal clock time to solar time requires three adjustments, accounting for 1) daylight savings time, 2) longitudinal offset from the central meridian of the local time zone, and 3) the “Equation of Time”, an offset from -15 to +15 minutes which varies by date. With accurate knowledge of these three factors, the clock can be adjusted to show “solar time” instead of “mean time” and, in that case, when solar noon arrives, the time on the clock will indeed show 12:00 just as the sun reaches its “culmination” or highest point in the sky.

If all the necessary corrections above are considered, a properly oriented clock face can be used to make inferences about cardinal directions. Otherwise, wristwatch-sun orientation methods could produce significant error.

== Examples ==
=== From aviation ===
In World War II aircraft pilots needed a quick method of communicating the relative position of threats, for which the clock system was ideal. The gunners of a bomber, or the other aircraft in the squadron, had to be kept informed for purposes of immediate response. However, in aviation, a clock position refers to a horizontal direction. The pilots needed a vertical dimension, so they supplemented the clock position with the word high or low to describe the vertical direction; e.g., 6 o'clock high means behind and above the horizon, while 12 o'clock low means ahead and below the horizon.

The horizon line was only visible in clear weather in daylight, and was only useful as a reference line in straight and level flight, when it appeared on the nose of the aircraft. The vocabulary therefore was only of use during daylight patrols or missions. The reference line and reference clock positions did not exist during combat aerobatics, at night, or during cloudy weather, when other means had to be found for locating the combatants, such as radar.

For airplanes in rapid maneuvers, air traffic controllers will issue the eight cardinal compass points instead.

=== From community planning ===
In 1916, J.B. Plato devised a clock system to identify farms around reference points in rural areas. A clock face was imagined centered on a rural community with 12:00 pointing true north. The circle was divided into concentric numbered bands at each mile of radius. The bands were divided into 12 segments at each position of the clock numbered after the clock hour. Within a segment, every building was assigned a letter. For instance, Alton 3-0 L meant house L in segment 3 of the central circle of 1 mile radius at Alton, where 3 was at 3:00.

=== From medicine ===
Medical pathology uses the clock system to describe the location of breast tumors. A clock face is considered imposed over each breast, left and right, centered on the alveolar region, with the positions shown around it. Tumors are located at one or more subsites, or clock positions, identified by one or more clock numbers. In addition the numbers are arranged in quadrants: Upper Outer Quadrant (UOQ), Lower Inner Quadrant (LIQ), and so on. Codes are assigned to the quadrants, the alveolar region, and the whole breast.

=== From golf ===
Golf players use the clock system to study the course of the ball in putting situations. For holes that are on a slope, the hole is imagined to be the center of a clock face with 12:00 at the high point and 6:00 at the low point. The ball will only run true when hit from the high or low points; otherwise, its course will break, or bend on the slope. Some golfers practice clock drill – hitting the ball from all the positions of the clock – to learn how it breaks.

=== From microscopy ===
An article in the Journal of Applied Microscopy for 1898 recommends the use of a polar coordinate system in the form of a clockface for recording the positions of microscopic objects on a slide. The face is conceived centered on the circle visible under the lens. The pole is the center. Angle is given as a clock number, and distance as a decimal percentage of the radius through the object. For example, “3,9” means 3:00 o'clock at 9 tenths of the radius.

== Errors ==
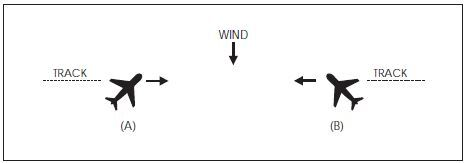
Traffic information would be issued to the pilot of aircraft “A” as 12 o'clock. The actual position of the traffic as seen by the pilot of aircraft “A” would be 2 o'clock. Traffic information issued to aircraft “B” would also be given as 12 o'clock, but in this case, the pilot of “B” would see the traffic at 10 o'clock.

Air traffic controls can only infer the aircraft heading from the ground track of an aircraft, which may not reflect the aircraft's actual heading due to drift angle caused by the wind. As a result, pilots should give due consideration and apply drift correction when an air traffic controller provides traffic advisories. Additionally, the error could also occur when the radar traffic information is issued while the aircraft is changing course.

== Instrumentation ==
Although the raw clock position is invaluable or indispensable in many circumstances requiring rapid response, for ordinary careful navigation it is not sufficiently precise. It can be made precise by various methods requiring the use of instruments.

== Origin of the clock positions ==
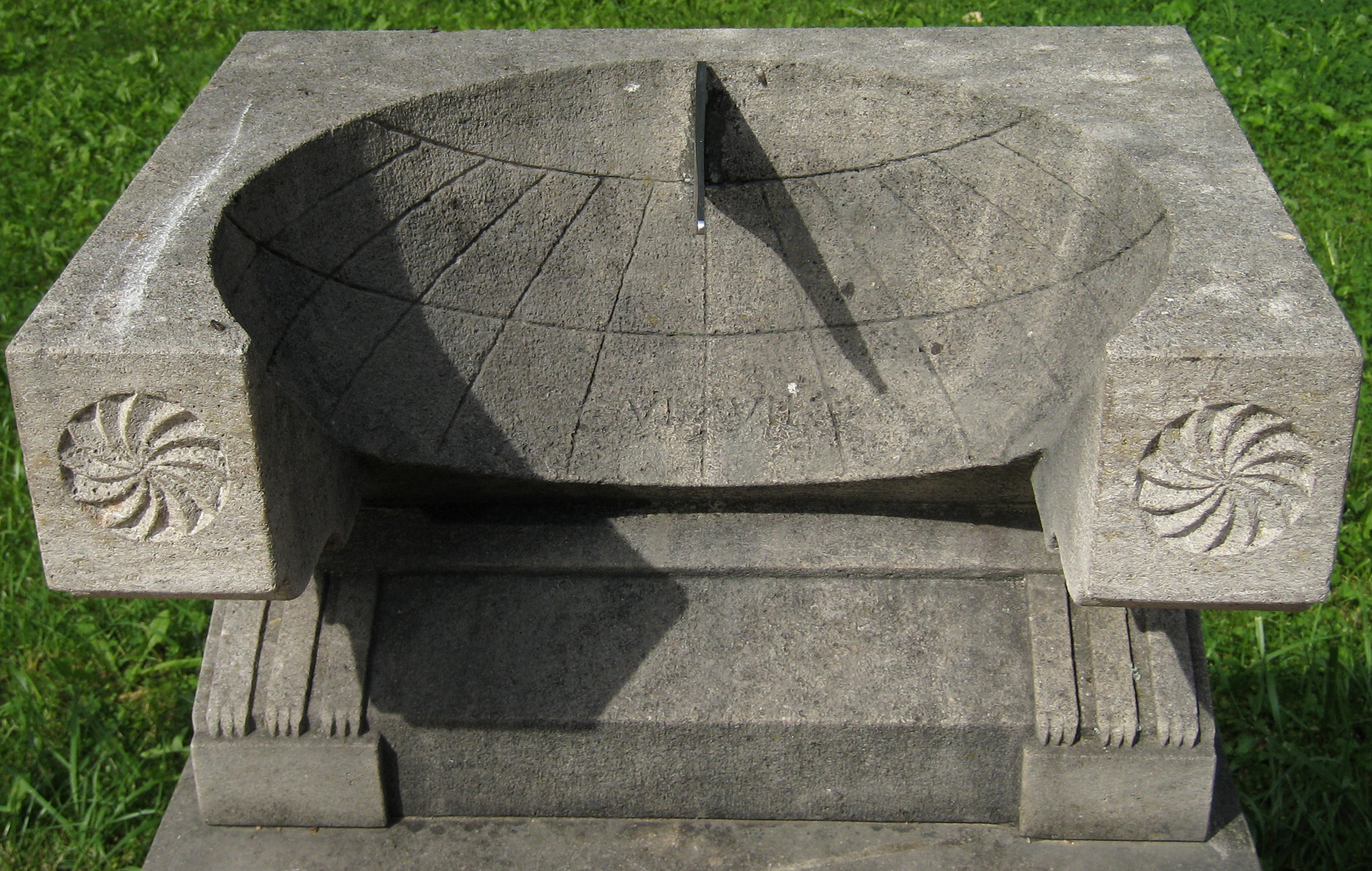
Roman basin sundial, a Mesopotamian type. The pointer casts a shadow over the engraved hour lines in the basin. The hours are numbered I-XII, running from the first hour of the day on the left to the last on the right. The pointer is set at meridies, “mid-day,” which is at 6:00. The hours are “seasonal;” that is, the number of degrees in an hour depends on the day of the year. 6:00 is intended to be a true bearing; that is, at 12:00 solar time the shadow over the VI line must point due north or south.

The clock face with its clock positions is a heritage of Roman civilization, as is suggested by the survival of Roman numerals on old clocks and their cultural predecessors, sundials. The mechanical clock supplanted the sundial as the major timekeeper, while the Hindu–Arabic numeral system replaced the Roman as the number system in Europe in the High Middle Ages. The Romans, however, had adapted their timekeeping system from the Ancient Greek. The historical trail leads from there to ancient Mesopotamia through the ancient Greek colonies placed on the coast of Anatolia in the 1st millennium BC. The first known historian, Herodotus of Halicarnassus, who was a native of that border region, made the identification:

...the sunclock (polon) and the sundial (gnomon), and the twelve divisions of the day, came to Hellas not from Egypt but from Babylonia.

The polos (“pole”) was a sundial of a concave face resembling the concavity of the universe (named a “pole” in this case). The gnomon was the pointer.

=== The Mesopotamian system ===
The Babylonian time system is documented by thousands of Mesopotamian cuneiform tablets. The Babylonians inherited the better part of their system from the Sumerians, whose culture they absorbed. Tablets of different periods reveal the development of a sexagesimal numbering system from decimal and duodecimal systems, which reveals itself in the construction of unique symbols for numerals 1-59 from natural finger decimals (ten fingers, ten symbols). Why they developed this system is a matter for academic debate, but there are multiple advantages, including division by several factors, offering several possible subdivisions, one of which is by 12's. Classical civilization adopted and adapted the Mesopotamian time system, and modern civilization adapted it still further. The modern system retains much of the sexagesimalism of the Sumerians, but typically not with the same detail.

Time today and generally in ancient Mesopotamia is given mainly in three digits. Today's state the hours, minutes, and seconds. In a strict sexagesimal system these three would be expressed in a single, three-digit sexagesimal number: h,m,s with values on each of the three letters of 0-59; that is, hours up to 60, minutes up to 60, and seconds up to 60. Because integer numbers are expressed as sums, in this case

h times 60^{2} + m times 60 + s

for the number of seconds, h, m, and s can be broken out and treated as separate numbers. Each number, however, implies the other two; e.g., a minute implies 60 seconds. m and s are straightforward, but h is different. There are no explicit 60 hours; the number instead is 24, and yet they are part of an implied sexagesimal system. 60 minutes is implied by one of the 24 hours, not one of the 60. The system is not strictly sexagesimal but is based on the sexagesimal.

A full Babylonian time determination also had three digits. Zeros were blank spaces, causing some difficulty of discerning them from character separators. For reasons that are not clear, the Mesopotamians adopted a standard of 12 hours per day for their first-order digit. Their day, however, was designed for measurement on their most ancient and widely used timepiece, the sundial, which showed only daylight hours. Daylight was the time between sunrise and sunset, each of those being defined as the appearance or disappearance of the top rim of the sun on the horizon. Daylight hours problematically were seasonal; that is, due to the variation of the length of the day with time of year, hour length was variable also. The Mesopotamians had discovered, however, that if the darkness was divided into 12 hours also, and each run of 12 was matched number for number: 1st to 1st, 2nd to 2nd, etc., the sum of each match was constant.

The 12-hour, seasonal day was one of many metrological arrangements that had developed during the 3rd millennium BC. It was in use in the Ur III period, at the end of the 3rd millennium. The vocabulary of time was not yet set. For example, the 60-hour day existed as the time-shekel, 1/60 of a working day, presumably so named from the labor cost of one hexagesimal hour. This was a time of strong kings and continuing administrations that took responsibility for weights and standards. Englund distinguishes two main types of system: the cultic, in which the events of the seasonal calendar assume religious significance, and are perpetuated for religious reasons, and a second, new type, the state, defined by an administration that needed to standardize its time units.

The state system came to predominate in the subsequent Old Babylonian period. The state administrators had perceived that the sun advances at a uniform rate no matter what the season. One sun cycle is always the same. Moreover, it matches the cycle of rotation of the stars around the pole star, the real reason being that the Earth rotates at a constant angular velocity. If hours were to represent divisions of the uniform rotation, they must also be uniform, and not be variable. There were two days of the year when all 24 hours were of the same length: the two equinoxes. The standard double hour (beru), of equinoctial length, representing two modern hours, of which there were 12 in the standard day (umu), was not conceived as being one of day and one of night, but as being just two consecutive equal-length hours. One standard day thus went on to become two consecutive equal 12-hour clockfaces in modern clock time. 30 standard days were a standard month, and 12 of those a standard year of 360 days. Some juggling of month lengths to make the 12 months fit the year was still required.

Within a day, single hours were unreliable. They came in all sizes. The double hour, however, originally the sum of a daylight hour and the corresponding night hour, was always the same. The statists therefore chose to use double units in definition. The 12-hour daytime had been divided into three seasonal watches. These were matched to three seasonal night watches, 1st to 1st, 2nd to 2nd, etc. One double watch (8 hours) was four double hours. One single watch (four hours) was two double hours.

To produce a second-order digit of a Babylonian time, the statists changed from solar to stellar time. The stars moved in visible circles at a fixed rate, which could be measured by the constant escape of water from a water clock. The single standard watch of 4 hours (two double hours) was divided into 60 time-degrees (ush). One double hour had 30, and one complete stellar day, 360 (12 times 30). This assignment was the creation of the 360-degree circle, as the degree went from being a time division to an angular distance of rotation. Time-degrees were all the same (one is about 4 minutes of modern time). The second-order digit counted the degrees that had gone by in the hour, notwithstanding the fact that its number of degrees were seasonal.

The third and last order digit divided the time-degree into 60 parts (the gar), which appears to be sexagesimal. In modern time it is 4 seconds. There are not 60 time-degrees in an hour, nor 60 hours in a day. The Babylonian time was thus three different numbers, only one of which was sexagesimal. Only its general features are modern: the 12-hour day followed by a 12-hour night, the 60-division 3rd-order digit, and the 360-degree circle.

== In media and culture ==
The 1949 movie Twelve O'Clock High takes its title from the system. In this case, the position would be ahead and above the horizon, an advantageous position for the attacker.

The phrase "on your six" refers to the six o'clock or the adjacent positions; that is, the expression cautions that someone is behind you or on your tail. Likewise, "check your six" or "check six" means "watch your back" or "watch out for yourself".

== See also ==
- Body relative direction
- Clock angle problem
- Port and starboard
- Hour angle
- Relative bearing

== Reference bibliography ==
- Dohrn-van Rossum, Gerhard; Dohrn, Gerhard (1996). History of the Hour: Clocks and Modern Temporal Orders. Translated by Dunlap, Thomas. Chicago; London: University of Chicago Press.
- Englund, R.K. (1988). "Administrative Timekeeping In Ancient Mesopotamia" (PDF). Journal of the Economic and Social History of the Orient. XXXI (2): 121–185. doi:10.1163/156852088X00070. Archived from the original (PDF) on 2020-07-10.
- Smith, Sidney (1969). "Babylonian Time Reckoning". Iraq. 31 (1). British Institute for the Study of Iraq: 74–81. doi:10.2307/4199869. JSTOR 4199869.
