= Computer arithmetic =

Implementation of arithmetic operations

Computer arithmetic is the scientific field that deals with representation of numbers on computers and corresponding implementations of the arithmetic operations.

It includes:

- Fixed-size arithmetic
  - "Integer arithmetic", which in practice is modular arithmetic by a power of 2.
  - Fixed-point arithmetic
  - Modular arithmetic
    - Multi-modular arithmetic
    - p-adic arithmetic, consisting of computing modulo a single prime number and retrieving the integer or rational result by using Hensel lifting
    - Finite field arithmetic
  - Floating-point arithmetic
- Arbitrary-precision arithmetic
- Interval arithmetic
- Symmetric level-index arithmetic
- Matrix arithmetic

In the cases where the size of the representation of a number is fixed (fixed-point, floating-point and interval arithmetic), the main concern is to control the computational error, as far as possible; see, for example IEEE 754.

In the other cases, where an exact result should be provided, the main concern is the practical efficiency, which is optimized by combining improvements of computational complexity with hardware specificities.

ARITH Symposium on Computer Arithmetic is an international symposium devoted to computer arithmetic.
