= Bingham distribution =

Antipodally symmetric probability distribution on the n-sphere

In statistics, the Bingham distribution, named after Christopher Bingham, is an antipodally symmetric probability distribution on the n-sphere. It is a generalization of the Watson distribution and a special case of the Kent and Fisher–Bingham distributions.

The Bingham distribution is widely used in paleomagnetic data analysis, and has been used in the field of computer vision.

Its probability density function is given by

$$f(\mathbf{x}\,;\,M,Z) \; dS^{n-1} = {}_1 F_1 \left( \tfrac12 ; \tfrac n2 ; Z \right)^{-1} \cdot \exp \left( \operatorname{tr} Z M^T \mathbf{x} \mathbf{x}^T M \right)\; dS^{n-1}$$

which may also be written

$$f(\mathbf{x}\,;\,M,Z)\; dS^{n-1} \;=\;
{}_1 F_1 \left( \tfrac12 ; \tfrac n2 ;Z \right)^{-1} \cdot \exp\left( \mathbf{x}^T M Z M^T \mathbf{x} \right)\; dS^{n-1}$$

where x is an axis (i.e., a unit vector), M is an orthogonal orientation matrix, Z is a diagonal concentration matrix, and ${}_{1}F_{1}(\cdot;\cdot,\cdot)$ is a confluent hypergeometric function of matrix argument. The matrices M and Z are the result of diagonalizing the positive-definite covariance matrix of the Gaussian distribution that underlies the Bingham distribution.

== See also ==
- Directional statistics
- von Mises–Fisher distribution
- Kent distribution
