= Christophe Ley =

Luxembourgish statistician

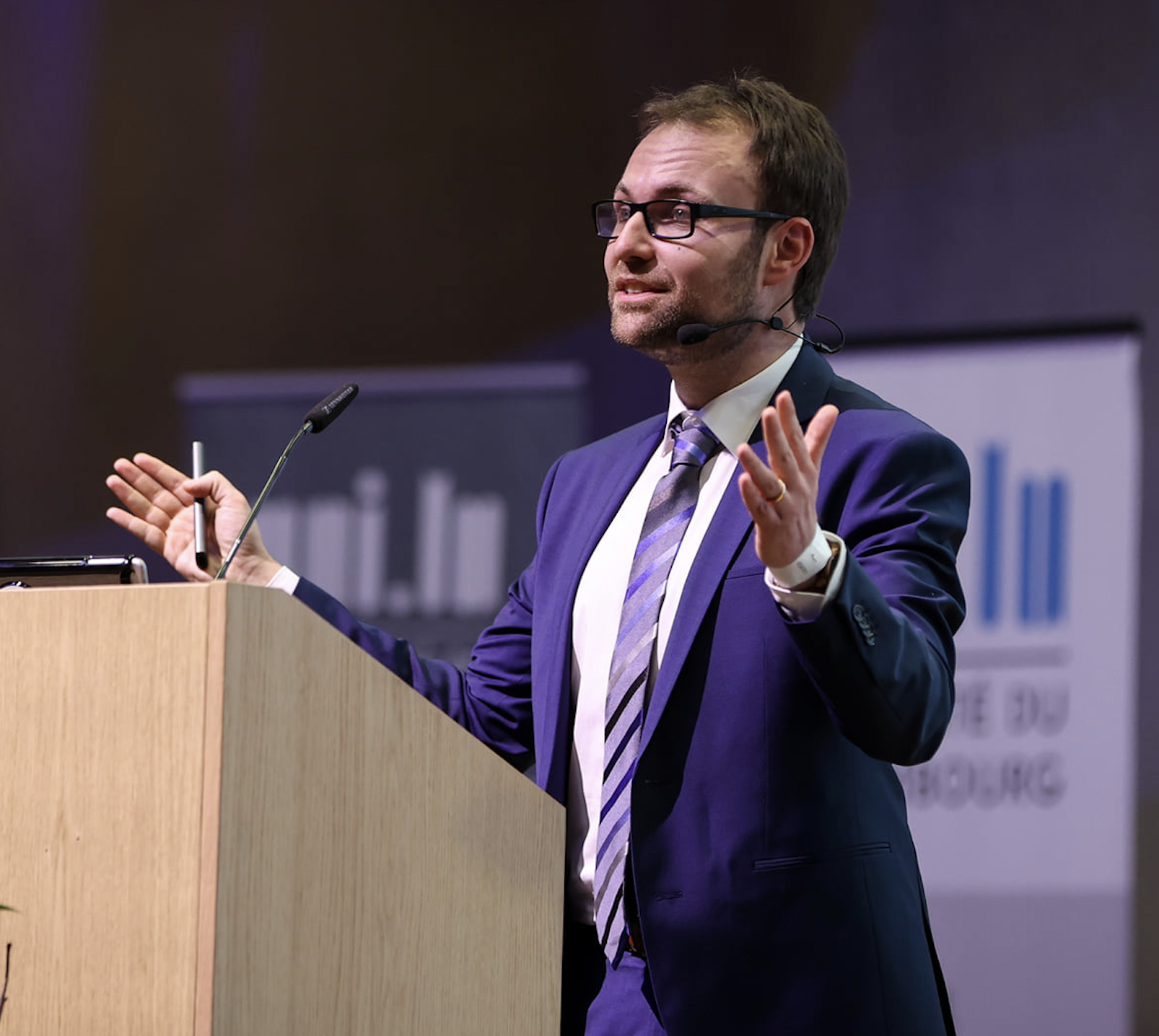
- Occupations: Academic and Author

Academic background
- Education: PhD
- Alma mater: Université libre de Bruxelles

Academic work
- Discipline: Mathematics
- Sub-discipline: Statistics
- Institutions: University of Luxembourg
- Main interests: Flexible modeling, Directional Statistics, Stein's Method, Sports analytics, AI for medicine
- Notable works: Modern Directional Statistics; Stein's Method for comparison of univariate distributions Machine Learning and Conventional Statistics - Making Sense of the Differences; A hybrid random forest to predict soccer matches in international tournaments Detecting outliers : Do not use standard deviation around the mean, use absolute deviation around the median

Christophe Ley is a Luxembourgish statistician, and an author and editor of books on directional statistics and sports statistics. He is president of the Luxembourg Statistical Society.

== Education and career ==
Ley obtained his PhD from the Université libre de Bruxelles under the supervision of Davy Paindaveine.

After his PhD, Christophe Ley was chargé de recherche of the National Fund for Scientific Research at the Université libre de Brussels until 2015, when he became assistant professor at Ghent University. He joined the University of Luxembourg in 2021 as associate professor.

== Selected publications ==
Ley is the co-author, with Thomas Verdebout, of the book Modern Directional Statistics (CRC Press, 2017) and the co-editor with Verdebout of Applied Directional Statistics: Modern Methods and Case Studies (CRC Press, 2018).

He is also the co-editor, with Yves Dominicy, of Statistics Meets Sports: What We Can Learn from Sports Data (Cambridge Scholars Publishing, 2023).
