= Christopher Bingham =

American statistician

Christopher Bingham is an American statistician who introduced the Bingham distribution. In joint work with C. M. D. Godfrey and John Tukey he introduced complex demodulation into the analysis of time series. The Kent distribution, also known as the Fisher–Bingham distribution, is named after Bingham and the English biologist and statistician Ronald Fisher.

Bingham studied mathematics at Yale University, receiving his PhD under the supervision of Alan Treleven James in 1964. His PhD theis was titled Distributions on the sphere and on the projective plane. He subsequently worked as a research associate at Princeton University with John Tukey.
