= Bivariate von Mises distribution =

Probability distribution on a torus

Samples from the cosine variant of the bivariate von Mises distribution. The green points are sampled from a distribution with high concentration and no correlation ($\kappa_1=\kappa_2=200$, $\kappa_3=0$), the blue points are sampled from a distribution with high concentration and negative correlation ($\kappa_1=\kappa_2=200$, $\kappa_3=100$), and the red points are sampled from a distribution with low concentration and no correlation ($\kappa_1=\kappa_2=20, \kappa_3=0$).

In probability theory and statistics, the bivariate von Mises distribution is a probability distribution describing values on a torus. It may be thought of as an analogue on the torus of the bivariate normal distribution. The distribution belongs to the field of directional statistics. The general bivariate von Mises distribution was first proposed by Kanti Mardia in 1975. One of its variants is today used in the field of bioinformatics to formulate a probabilistic model of protein structure in atomic detail, such as backbone-dependent rotamer libraries.

== Definition ==
The bivariate von Mises distribution is a probability distribution defined on the torus, $S^1 \times S^1$ in $\mathbb{R}^3$. The probability density function of the general bivariate von Mises distribution for the angles $\phi, \psi \in [0, 2\pi]$ is given by

$$f(\phi, \psi) \propto \exp [ \kappa_1 \cos(\phi - \mu) + \kappa_2 \cos(\psi - \nu) + (\cos(\phi-\mu), \sin(\phi-\mu)) \mathbf{A} (\cos(\psi - \nu), \sin(\psi - \nu))^T ],$$

where $\mu$ and $\nu$ are the means for $\phi$ and $\psi$, $\kappa_1$ and $\kappa_2$ their concentration and the matrix $\mathbf{A} \in \mathbb{M}(2,2)$ is related to their correlation.

Two commonly used variants of the bivariate von Mises distribution are the sine and cosine variant.

The cosine variant of the bivariate von Mises distribution has the probability density function

$$f(\phi, \psi) = Z_c(\kappa_1, \kappa_2, \kappa_3) \ \exp [ \kappa_1 \cos(\phi - \mu) + \kappa_2 \cos(\psi - \nu) - \kappa_3 \cos(\phi - \mu - \psi + \nu) ],$$

where $\mu$ and $\nu$ are the means for $\phi$ and $\psi$, $\kappa_1$ and $\kappa_2$ their concentration and $\kappa_3$ is related to their correlation. $Z_c$ is the normalization constant. This distribution with $\kappa_3$=0 has been used for kernel density estimates of the distribution of the protein dihedral angles $\phi$ and $\psi$.

The sine variant has the probability density function

$$f(\phi, \psi) = Z_s(\kappa_1, \kappa_2, \kappa_3) \ \exp [ \kappa_1 \cos(\phi - \mu) + \kappa_2 \cos(\psi - \nu) + \kappa_3 \sin(\phi - \mu) \sin(\psi - \nu) ],$$

where the parameters have the same interpretation.

== See also ==
- Von Mises distribution, a similar distribution on the one-dimensional unit circle
- Kent distribution, a related distribution on the two-dimensional unit sphere
- von Mises–Fisher distribution
- Directional statistics
