= Kent distribution =

Probability distribution on a sphere

Three points sets sampled from the Kent distribution. The mean directions are shown with arrows. The $\kappa\,$ parameter is highest for the red set.

In directional statistics, the Kent distribution, also known as the 5-parameter Fisher–Bingham distribution (named after John T. Kent, Ronald Fisher, and Christopher Bingham), is a probability distribution on the unit sphere (2-sphere S^{2} in 3-space R^{3}). It is the analogue on S^{2} of the bivariate normal distribution with an unconstrained covariance matrix. The Kent distribution was proposed by John T. Kent in 1982, and is used in geology as well as bioinformatics.

== Definition ==
The probability density function $f(\mathbf{x})\,$ of the Kent distribution is given by:

$$f(\mathbf{x}) = \frac{1}{\textrm{c}(\kappa,\beta)}\exp\left\{ \kappa \boldsymbol{\gamma}_1^T \mathbf{x} + \beta[(\boldsymbol{\gamma}_2^T \mathbf{x})^2-(\boldsymbol{\gamma}_3^T \mathbf{x})^2]\right\}$$

where $\mathbf{x}\,$ is a three-dimensional unit vector, $(\cdot)^T$ denotes the transpose of $(\cdot)$, and the normalizing constant $\textrm{c}(\kappa,\beta)\,$ is:

$$c(\kappa,\beta) = 2\pi\sum_{j=0}^\infty \frac{\Gamma(j+\frac{1}{2})}{\Gamma(j+1)}\beta^{2j}\left(\frac{1}{2}\kappa\right)^{-2j-\frac{1}{2}} I_{2j+\frac{1}{2}}(\kappa)$$

Where $I_v(\kappa)$ is the modified Bessel function and $\Gamma(\cdot)$ is the gamma function. Note that $c(0,0) = 4\pi$ and $c(\kappa,0)=4\pi(\kappa^{-1})\sinh(\kappa)$, the normalizing constant of the Von Mises–Fisher distribution.

The parameter $\kappa\,$ (with $\kappa>0\,$ ) determines the concentration or spread of the distribution, while $\beta\,$ (with $0\leq2\beta<\kappa$ ) determines the ellipticity of the contours of equal probability. The higher the $\kappa\,$ and $\beta\,$ parameters, the more concentrated and elliptical the distribution will be, respectively. Vector $\boldsymbol{\gamma}_1\,$ is the mean direction, and vectors $\boldsymbol{\gamma}_2,\boldsymbol{\gamma}_3\,$ are the major and minor axes. The latter two vectors determine the orientation of the equal probability contours on the sphere, while the first vector determines the common center of the contours. The $3 \times 3$ matrix $(\boldsymbol{\gamma}_1,\boldsymbol{\gamma}_2,\boldsymbol{\gamma}_3)\,$ must be orthogonal.

== Generalization to higher dimensions ==
The Kent distribution can be easily generalized to spheres in higher dimensions. If $x$ is a point on the unit sphere $S^{p-1}$ in $\mathbb{R}^p$, then the density function of the $p$-dimensional Kent distribution is proportional to

$$\exp \left\{\kappa \boldsymbol{\gamma}_1^T\mathbf{x} + \sum_{j=2}^p \beta_j (\boldsymbol{\gamma}_j^T\mathbf{x})^2 \right\} \ ,$$

where $\sum_{j=2}^p \beta_j =0$ and $0 \le 2|\beta_j| <\kappa$ and the vectors $\{ \boldsymbol{\gamma}_j \mid j=1, \ldots, p\}$ are orthonormal. However, the normalization constant becomes very difficult to work with for $p>3$.

== See also ==
- Directional statistics
- Von Mises–Fisher distribution
- Bivariate von Mises distribution
- Von Mises distribution
- Bingham distribution
