= Kanti Mardia =

Indian statistician (born 1935)

Kanti V. Mardia OBE
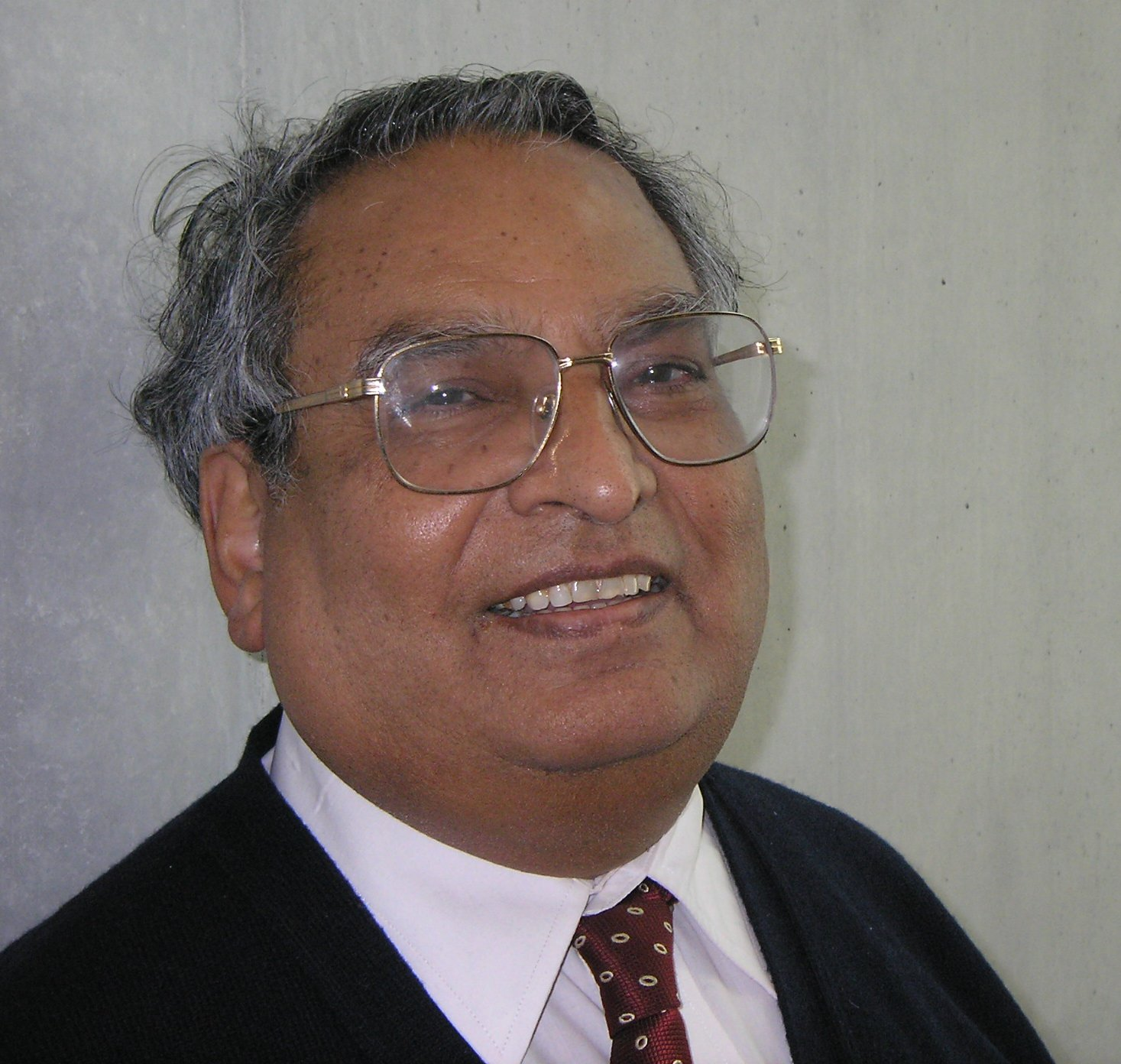
- Mardia in 2008
- Born: 3 April 1935 (age 91)
- Education: PhD (1965) from University of Rajasthan, PhD (1967) and DSc (1973) from University of Newcastle Upon Tyne
- Alma mater: Ismail Yusuf College, University of Bombay, University of Poona, University of Rajasthan, University of Newcastle Upon Tyne
- Known for: Bivariate von Mises distribution Multivariate Pareto distribution Mardia test
- Awards: Guy Medal (Silver, 2003); Wilks Memorial Award (2013)
- Scientific career
- Fields: Statistics
- Workplaces: University of Leeds

Kantilal Vardichand "Kanti" Mardia OBE (born 1935) is an Indian-British statistician specialising in directional statistics, multivariate analysis, geostatistics, statistical bioinformatics and statistical shape analysis. He was born in Sirohi, Rajasthan, India in a Jain family and now resides and works in Leeds. He is known for his series of tests of multivariate normality based measures of multivariate skewness and kurtosis as well as work on the statistical measures of shape.

== Life and career ==
Mardia was educated at the Ismail Yusuf College at the University of Bombay (BSc 1955, MSc in statistics 1957), the University of Poona (MSc in pure mathematics 1961), the University of Rajasthan (PhD 1965) and the University of Newcastle Upon Tyne (PhD 1967, DSc 1973). He held academic positions at the Institute of Science, Mumbai and the University of Hull.

Mardia was appointed professor of applied statistics and head of the Department of Statistics in the School of Mathematics at the University of Leeds in 1973. He retired in 2000 with the title emeritus professor and is currently senior research professor of applied statistics at Leeds, where he has held the Leverhulme Emeritus Fellowship since 2017. He has been a long-term visiting professor at the University of Oxford since 2013, and was adjunct faculty with the Indian Institute of Management Ahmedabad from 2012 to 2014.

He helped establish both the Centre of Medical Imaging Research (CoMIR) and the Centre of Statistical Bioinformatics (CoSB) at Leeds, and was initially the director of CoMIR. He has written several books and edited conference proceedings.

In 1973, Mardia founded the University of Leeds Annual Statistics Research Workshops, designed to promote interdisciplinary research. These workshops attract an international audience and focus on applied statistical topics.

Mardia has received a number of honours, including a 2003 Guy Medal in Silver from the Royal Statistical Society, which noted "his many path breaking contributions to statistical science ... and his lasting leadership role in interdisciplinary research"; the 2013 Wilks Memorial Award from the American Statistical Association, which noted his "seminal results in shape analysis, spatial statistics, multivariate analysis, directional data analysis, and bioinformatics"; the 2019 Lifetime Achievement Award from the International Indian Statistical Association; the 2020 Mahatma Gandhi Medal of Honour from the NRI Institute; and the 2021 OneJAIN Life Achievement Award from the Jain All-Party Parliamentary Group. He is the founding Vice-President of International Indian Statistical Association, and a Fellow of the American Statistical Association, the Institute of Mathematical Statistics, and the Royal Statistical Society. The Karlsruhe Institute of Technology's 2020 Virtual Symposium on Directional Statistics was dedicated to Mardia. He gave the 40th Fisher Memorial Lecture on 18 November 2022 at the Oxford Mathematical Institute. A festschrift honoring his work resulted in an edited volume, Geometry Driven Statistics.

The inaugural Mardia Lecture Series was launched by the University of Leeds on 7 November 2024 in recognition of his contribution to statistical science, with the opening lecture delivered by Prof. Peter Green FRS of the University of Bristol.

Mardia's 90th birthday was celebrated at the 2025 edition of the triennial Adista conference on statistics, Mardia himself joining by video call to address the attendees and discuss the future of directional statistics.

He is a practicing Jain and strict vegetarian. His 1990 book The Scientific Foundations of Jainism introduced the Four Noble Truths of Jains. His subsequent book Destructive Emotions: Jain Perspectives, published in 2024 was awarded Best Book 2025 by the prestigious International School for Jain Studies. In 1987 he founded the Yorkshire Jain Foundation.

Mardia was appointed Officer of the Order of the British Empire (OBE) in the 2023 New Year Honours for services to statistical science.

== Books ==
- Families of Bivariate Distributions (1970)
- Multivariate Analysis, coauthored with John T. Kent and John Bibby (1979)
- Directional Statistics, coauthored with Peter Jupp, (1999) (first published under the title Statistics of Directional Data, 1972)
- Bayesian Methods in Structural Bioinformatics, co-edited with Thomas Hamelryck and Jesper Ferkinghoff-Borg (2012)
- Statistical Shape Analysis, coauthored with Ian L. Dryden (2016) (first edition 1998)
- Spatial Analysis, coauthored with John T. Kent (2022)
- Multivariate Analysis Second Edition, coauthored with John T. Kent and Charles C. Taylor (2024)
- The Scientific Foundations of Jainism (1990)
- Living Jainism: An Ethical Science, coauthored with Aidan Rankin (2013)
- Destructive Emotions: Jain Perspectives (2024)

== Mardia Prize ==
The Mardia Prize, awarded by the Royal Statistical Society, was founded by Mardia in 2015 to foster collaboration between statisticians and scientists via "workshops in emerging interdisciplinary areas". The first award was given in 2016 (Topic: renewable natural resources management, food security, climate change and the illegal wildlife trade) with the second in 2018 (Topic: extreme weather research) and the third in 2019 (Topic: economics of mental health).
