= Mean operation =

In algebraic topology, a mean or mean operation on a topological space X is a continuous, commutative, idempotent binary operation on X. If the operation is also associative, it defines a semilattice. A classic problem is to determine which spaces admit a mean. For example, Euclidean spaces admit a mean -- the usual average of two vectors -- but spheres of positive dimension do not, including the circle.
