= Nicholas Fisher (statistician) =

Australian statistician

Nicholas Irving Fisher is an Australian statistician and entrepreneur. He was a statistical researcher at the CSIRO for over 30 years and has founded the analytics company ValueMetrics Australia. He has contributed to the development and applications of directional statistics in geosciences, and statistical methods for quality improvement, specifically performance measurement for enterprises.

== Education and career ==
Fisher was born in Melbourne, Australia. He studied at the University of Sydney, where he received his BSc in 1968 and MSc in 1970. He then went to University of North Carolina at Chapel Hill, where he studied under Wassily Hoeffding and obtained his PhD in statistics in 1975. Fisher joined CSIRO in 1969, before he started his PhD, and rose through the ranks over the years until 1997, when he became a chief research scientist. At CSIRO he led the development of the organisation's performance management system. He was awarded a DSc by the University of Sydney in 1994 for his work in directional statistics. He left CSIRO in 2001 to found the analytics research enterprise ValueMetrics Australia and also became a Visiting Professor of Statistics at the University of Sydney. He is professionally accredited by the Statistical Society of Australia and by the American Statistical Association.

== Honors and awards ==
Fisher became a Fellow of the American Statistical Association in 1991 and an Honorary Life Member of the Statistical Society of Australia in 1997. He received the service award from the International Statistical Institute in 2015. He was named the W. Edwards Deming Lecturer by the American Statistical Association in 2019. Fisher was elected a Fellow of the Royal Society of New South Wales in 2025.

== Bibliography ==
=== Books ===
- Fisher, N. I.; Lewis, T.; Embleton, B. J. J. (1987). Statistical Analysis of Spherical Data. Cambridge: Cambridge University Press. doi:10.1017/cbo9780511623059. ISBN 978-0-521-45699-9.
- Fisher, N. I. (1993). Statistical Analysis of Circular Data. Cambridge: Cambridge University Press. doi:10.1017/cbo9780511564345. ISBN 978-0-521-56890-6.
- Fisher, N. I.; Sen, P. K., eds. (1994). The Collected Works of Wassily Hoeffding. Springer Series in Statistics. doi:10.1007/978-1-4612-0865-5. ISBN 978-1-4612-6926-7.
- Fisher, N. I. (2013). Analytics for Leaders: A Performance Measurement System for Business Success. Cambridge: Cambridge University Press. doi:10.1017/cbo9781107053779. ISBN 978-1-107-04556-9.
- Fisher, Nicholas I.; Tanaka, Yutaka; Woodall, William (2018). The Industrial Application of Statistical Quality Control by Homer M Sarasohn : a Historical Perspective. Newark: John Wiley & Sons, Incorporated. ISBN 978-1-119-51498-5. OCLC 1083043911.

=== Selected papers ===
- Fisher, N.I., J.F. Huntington, D.R. Jackett, M.E. Willcox & J.W. Creasey (1985), "Spatial analysis of two–dimensional orientation data". J. Math. Geol. 17 177–194. https://doi.org/10.1007/bf01033153
- Dransfield, S.B., N.I. Fisher & N.J. Vogel (1999), "Using statistics and statistical thinking to improve organisational performance". With discussion and authors’ reply. International Statistical Review, 67 (1999), 99-150. https://doi.org/10.2307/1403390
- Fisher, N. I.; Lee, A. J. (1986). "Correlation coefficients for random variables on the sphere and the hypersphere". Biometrika. 73: 159–164. doi:10.1093/biomet/73.1.159.
- Hall, Peter; Fisher, Nicholas I.; Hoffmann, Branka (1994). "On the Nonparametric Estimation of Covariance Functions". The Annals of Statistics. 22 (4). doi:10.1214/aos/1176325774. ISSN 0090-5364.
- Friedman, Jerome H.; Fisher, Nicholas I. (1999). "Bump hunting in high-dimensional data". Statistics and Computing. 9 (2): 123–143. doi:10.1023/A:1008894516817. S2CID 13647556.
- Fisher, N. I; Switzer, P (2001). "Graphical Assessment of Dependence: Is a Picture Worth 100 Tests?". The American Statistician. 55 (3): 233–239. doi:10.1198/000313001317098248. ISSN 0003-1305. S2CID 219596118.
- Fisher, N.I., J.H.J. Cribb & A.J. Peacock (2008), “ Reading the public mind: a novel approach to improving the adoption of new science and technology”. Australian Journal of Experimental Agriculture 47(11), 1–10. https://doi.org/10.1071/ea07004
- Fisher, N.I. (2009), “Homer Sarasohn and American involvement in the evolution of Quality Management in Japan, 1945-1950”. International Statistical Review 77, 276–299. https://doi.org/10.1002/9781119515012.oth2
- Fisher, N. I. (2015), “A conversation with Jerry Friedman”. Statistical Science 30, 268–295. https://doi.org/10.1214/14-sts509
- Fisher, N.I. (2019) “A Comprehensive Approach to Problems of Performance Measurement”. Journal of the Royal Statistical Society Series A. Read before the Royal Statistical Society, 16 January 2019. 182 (3), 755–803. https://doi.org/10.1111/rssa.12424
- Fisher, N.I. & Kordupleski, R.E. (2019), “Good and Bad Market Research: What’s Wrong with Net Promoter Score, and Why”. Applied Stochastic Models in Business and Industry 35 (1), 138-151. https://doi.org/10.1002/asmb.2417
- N. I. Fisher & D. J. Trewin (2021), “A proposal to enhance national capability to manage epidemics: The critical importance of expert statistical input including official statistics”. Statistical Journal of the IAOS 37, 1 – 17. 2021. doi:10.3233/SJI-210808
- Fisher, N. I. (2021), “ Performance Measurement: Issues, approaches and opportunities”. Harvard Data Science Review 3.4. Fall 2021. Published Oct 29, 2021. https://doi.org/10.1162/99608f92.c28d2a68.
- Fisher, Nicholas I., Peter D. Lunn & Stephen Sasse (2021), “Enhancing Value by Continuously Improving Enterprise Culture”. Journal of Creating Value 7(2), 1 – 23. https://doi.org/10.1177/23949643211044048
- Fisher, N. I. (2022), “ Assessing the Quality of Universities: A Gedankenexperiment Derived from Creating Stakeholder Value”. 8(1), 25 – 44. https://doi.org/10.1177/23949643221078120.
