= Hypergeometric function of a matrix argument =

In mathematics, the hypergeometric function of a matrix argument is a generalization of the classical hypergeometric series. It is a function defined by an infinite summation which can be used to evaluate certain multivariate integrals.

Hypergeometric functions of a matrix argument have applications in random matrix theory. For example, the distributions of the extreme eigenvalues of random matrices are often expressed in terms of the hypergeometric function of a matrix argument.

== Definition ==
Let $p\ge 0$ and $q\ge 0$ be integers, and let $X$ be an $m\times m$ complex symmetric matrix. Then the hypergeometric function of a matrix argument $X$ and parameter $\alpha>0$ is defined as

$$_pF_q^{(\alpha )}(a_1,\ldots,a_p;
b_1,\ldots,b_q;X) =
\sum_{k=0}^\infty\sum_{\kappa\vdash k}
\frac{1}{k!}\cdot
\frac{(a_1)^{(\alpha )}_\kappa\cdots(a_p)_\kappa^{(\alpha )}}
{(b_1)_\kappa^{(\alpha )}\cdots(b_q)_\kappa^{(\alpha )}} \cdot
C_\kappa^{(\alpha )}(X),$$

where $\kappa\vdash k$ means $\kappa$ is a partition of $k$, $(a_i)^{(\alpha )}_{\kappa}$ is the generalized Pochhammer symbol, and $C_\kappa^{(\alpha )}(X)$ is the "C" normalization of the Jack function.

== Two matrix arguments ==
If $X$ and $Y$ are two $m\times m$ complex symmetric matrices, then the hypergeometric function of two matrix arguments is defined as:

$$_pF_q^{(\alpha )}(a_1,\ldots,a_p;
b_1,\ldots,b_q;X,Y) =
\sum_{k=0}^\infty\sum_{\kappa\vdash k}
\frac{1}{k!}\cdot
\frac{(a_1)^{(\alpha )}_\kappa\cdots(a_p)_\kappa^{(\alpha )}}
{(b_1)_\kappa^{(\alpha )}\cdots(b_q)_\kappa^{(\alpha )}} \cdot
\frac{C_\kappa^{(\alpha )}(X)
C_\kappa^{(\alpha )}(Y)
}{C_\kappa^{(\alpha )}(I)},$$

where $I$ is the identity matrix of size $m$.

== Not a typical function of a matrix argument ==
Unlike other functions of matrix argument, such as the matrix exponential, which are matrix-valued, the hypergeometric function of (one or two) matrix arguments is scalar-valued.

== The parameter α ==
In many publications the parameter $\alpha$ is omitted. Also, in different publications different values of $\alpha$ are being implicitly assumed. For example, in the theory of real random matrices (see, e.g., Muirhead, 1984), $\alpha=2$ whereas in other settings (e.g., in the complex case—see Gross and Richards, 1989), $\alpha=1$. To make matters worse, in random matrix theory researchers tend to prefer a parameter called $\beta$ instead of $\alpha$ which is used in combinatorics.

The thing to remember is that

$$\alpha=\frac{2}{\beta}.$$

Care should be exercised as to whether a particular text is using a parameter $\alpha$ or $\beta$ and which the particular value of that parameter is.

Typically, in settings involving real random matrices, $\alpha=2$ and thus $\beta=1$. In settings involving complex random matrices, one has $\alpha=1$ and $\beta=2$.
