= Directional statistics =

Subdiscipline of statistics

Directional statistics (also circular statistics or spherical statistics) is the subdiscipline of statistics that deals with directions (unit vectors in Euclidean space, R^{n}), axes (lines through the origin in R^{n}) or rotations in R^{n}. More generally, directional statistics deals with observations on compact Riemannian manifolds including the Stiefel manifold.

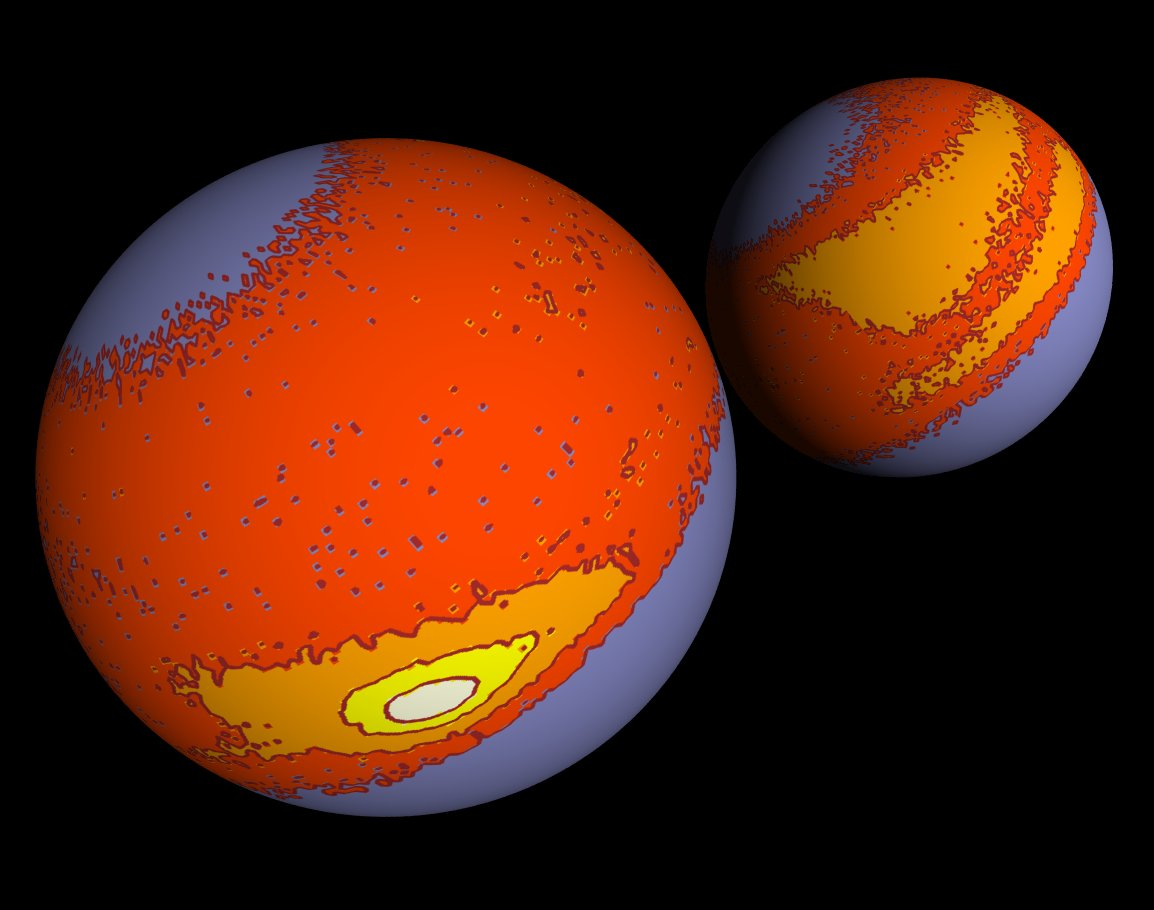
The overall shape of a protein can be parameterized as a sequence of points on the unit sphere. Shown are two views of the spherical histogram of such points for a large collection of protein structures. The statistical treatment of such data is in the realm of directional statistics.

The fact that 0 degrees and 360 degrees are identical angles, so that for example 180 degrees is not a sensible mean of 2 degrees and 358 degrees, provides one illustration that special statistical methods are required for the analysis of some types of data (in this case, angular data). Other examples of data that may be regarded as directional include statistics involving temporal periods (e.g. time of day, week, month, year, etc.), compass directions, dihedral angles in molecules, orientations, rotations and so on.

== Circular distributions ==
Any probability density function (pdf) $\ p(x)$ on the line can be "wrapped" around the circumference of a circle of unit radius. That is, the pdf of the wrapped variable
$$\theta = x_w=x \bmod 2\pi\ \ \in (-\pi,\pi]$$
is
$$p_w(\theta) = \sum_{k=-\infty}^{\infty}{p(\theta+2\pi k)}.$$

This concept can be extended to the multivariate context by an extension of the simple sum to a number of $F$ sums that cover all dimensions in the feature space:
$$p_w(\boldsymbol\theta) = \sum_{k_1=-\infty}^{\infty} \cdots \sum_{k_F=-\infty}^\infty {p(\boldsymbol\theta + 2\pi k_1\mathbf{e}_1 + \dots + 2\pi k_F\mathbf{e}_F)}$$
where $\mathbf{e}_k = (0, \dots, 0, 1, 0, \dots, 0)^{\mathsf{T}}$ is the $k$-th Euclidean basis vector.

The following sections show some relevant circular distributions.

=== von Mises circular distribution ===
The von Mises distribution is a circular distribution which, like any other circular distribution, may be thought of as a wrapping of a certain linear probability distribution around the circle. The underlying linear probability distribution for the von Mises distribution is mathematically intractable; however, for statistical purposes, there is no need to deal with the underlying linear distribution. The usefulness of the von Mises distribution is twofold: it is the most mathematically tractable of all circular distributions, allowing simpler statistical analysis, and it is a close approximation to the wrapped normal distribution, which, analogously to the linear normal distribution, is important because it is the limiting case for the sum of a large number of small angular deviations. In fact, the von Mises distribution is often known as the "circular normal" distribution because of its ease of use and its close relationship to the wrapped normal distribution.

The pdf of the von Mises distribution is:
$$f(\theta;\mu,\kappa) = \frac{e^{\kappa\cos(\theta-\mu)}}{2\pi I_0(\kappa)}$$
where $I_0$ is the modified Bessel function of order 0.

=== Circular uniform distribution ===
The probability density function (pdf) of the circular uniform distribution is given by
$$U(\theta) = \frac 1 {2\pi}.$$

It can also be thought of as $\kappa = 0$ of the von Mises above.

=== Wrapped normal distribution ===
The pdf of the wrapped normal distribution (WN) is:
$$WN(\theta;\mu,\sigma) = \frac{1}{\sigma \sqrt{2\pi}} \sum^{\infty}_{k=-\infty} \exp \left[\frac{-(\theta - \mu - 2\pi k)^2}{2 \sigma^2} \right] = \frac{1}{2\pi}\vartheta\left(\frac{\theta-\mu}{2\pi},\frac{i\sigma^2}{2\pi}\right)$$
where μ and σ are the mean and standard deviation of the unwrapped distribution, respectively and $\vartheta(\theta,\tau)$ is the Jacobi theta function:
$$\vartheta(\theta,\tau) = \sum_{n=-\infty}^\infty (w^2)^n q^{n^2}$$
where $w \equiv e^{i\pi \theta}$ and $q \equiv e^{i\pi\tau}.$

=== Wrapped Cauchy distribution ===
The pdf of the wrapped Cauchy distribution (WC) is:
$$WC(\theta;\theta_0,\gamma) = \sum_{n=-\infty}^\infty \frac{\gamma}{\pi(\gamma^2+(\theta+2\pi n-\theta_0)^2)}
= \frac{1}{2\pi}\,\,\frac{\sinh\gamma}{\cosh\gamma-\cos(\theta-\theta_0)}$$
where $\gamma$ is the scale factor and $\theta_0$ is the peak position.

=== Wrapped Lévy distribution ===
The pdf of the wrapped Lévy distribution (WL) is:
$$f_{WL}(\theta;\mu,c) = \sum_{n=-\infty}^\infty \sqrt{\frac{c}{2\pi}}\,\frac{e^{-c/2(\theta+2\pi n-\mu)}}{(\theta+2\pi n-\mu)^{3/2}}$$
where the value of the summand is taken to be zero when $\theta+2\pi n-\mu \le 0$, $c$ is the scale factor and $\mu$ is the location parameter.

=== Projected normal distribution ===
The projected normal distribution is a circular distribution representing the direction of a random variable with multivariate normal distribution, obtained by radial projection of the variable over the unit (n-1)-sphere. Due to this, and unlike other commonly used circular distributions, it is not symmetric nor unimodal.

== Distributions on higher-dimensional manifolds ==
Three points sets sampled from different Kent distributions on the sphere.

There also exist distributions on the two-dimensional sphere (such as the Kent distribution), the N-dimensional sphere (the von Mises–Fisher distribution) or the torus (the bivariate von Mises distribution).

The matrix von Mises–Fisher distribution is a distribution on the Stiefel manifold, and can be used to construct probability distributions over rotation matrices.

The Bingham distribution is a distribution over axes in N dimensions, or equivalently, over points on the (N − 1)-dimensional sphere with the antipodes identified. For example, if N = 2, the axes are undirected lines through the origin in the plane. In this case, each axis cuts the unit circle in the plane (which is the one-dimensional sphere) at two points that are each other's antipodes. For N = 4, the Bingham distribution is a distribution over the space of unit quaternions (versors). Since a versor corresponds to a rotation matrix, the Bingham distribution for N = 4 can be used to construct probability distributions over the space of rotations, just like the Matrix-von Mises–Fisher distribution.

These distributions are for example used in geology, crystallography and bioinformatics.

== Moments ==
The raw vector (or trigonometric) moments of a circular distribution are defined as

$$m_n=\operatorname E(z^n)=\int_\Gamma P(\theta) z^n \, d\theta$$

where $\Gamma$ is any interval of length $2\pi$, $P(\theta)$ is the PDF of the circular distribution, and $z=e^{i \theta}$. Since the integral $P(\theta)$ is unity, and the integration interval is finite, it follows that the moments of any circular distribution are always finite and well defined.

Sample moments are analogously defined:

$$\overline{m}_n=\frac{1}{N}\sum_{i=1}^N z_i^n.$$

The population resultant vector, length, and mean angle are defined in analogy with the corresponding sample parameters.

$$\rho=m_1$$

$$R=|m_1|$$

$$\theta_n=\operatorname{Arg}(m_n).$$

In addition, the lengths of the higher moments are defined as:

$$R_n=|m_n|$$

while the angular parts of the higher moments are just $(n \theta_n) \bmod 2\pi$. The lengths of all moments will lie between 0 and 1.

== Measures of location and spread ==
Various measures of central tendency and statistical dispersion may be defined for both the population and a sample drawn from that population.

=== Central tendency ===
The most common measure of location is the circular mean. The population circular mean is simply the first moment of the distribution while the sample mean is the first moment of the sample. The sample mean will serve as an unbiased estimator of the population mean.

When data is concentrated, the median and mode may be defined by analogy to the linear case, but for more dispersed or multi-modal data, these concepts are not useful.

=== Dispersion ===
The most common measures of circular spread are:

- The circular variance. For the sample the circular variance is defined as:
  $$\overline{\operatorname{Var}(z)} = 1 - \overline{R}$$
  and for the population
  $$\operatorname{Var}(z) = 1 - R$$
  Both will have values between 0 and 1.
- The circular standard deviation
  $$S(z) = \sqrt{\ln(1/R^2)} = \sqrt{-2\ln(R)}$$
  $$\overline{S}(z) = \sqrt{\ln(1/{\overline{R}}^2)} = \sqrt{-2\ln({\overline{R}})}$$
  with values between 0 and infinity. This definition of the standard deviation (rather than the square root of the variance) is useful because for a wrapped normal distribution, it is an estimator of the standard deviation of the underlying normal distribution. It will therefore allow the circular distribution to be standardized as in the linear case, for small values of the standard deviation. This also applies to the von Mises distribution which closely approximates the wrapped normal distribution. Note that for small $S(z)$, we have $S(z)^2 = 2 \operatorname{Var}(z)$.
- The circular dispersion
  $$\delta = \frac{1-R_2}{2R^2}$$
  $$\overline{\delta}=\frac{1-{\overline{R}_2}}{2{\overline{R}}^2}$$
  with values between 0 and infinity. This measure of spread is found useful in the statistical analysis of variance.

== Distribution of the mean ==
Given a set of N measurements $z_n=e^{i\theta_n}$ the mean value of z is defined as:

$$\overline{z}=\frac{1}{N}\sum_{n=1}^N z_n$$

which may be expressed as

$$\overline{z} = \overline{C}+i\overline{S}$$

where

$$\overline{C} = \frac{1}{N}\sum_{n=1}^N \cos(\theta_n) \text{ and } \overline{S} = \frac{1}{N}\sum_{n=1}^N \sin(\theta_n)$$

or, alternatively as:

$$\overline{z} = \overline{R}e^{i\overline{\theta}}$$

where

$$\overline{R} = \sqrt{{\overline{C}}^2+{\overline{S}}^2} \text{ and } \overline{\theta} = \arctan (\overline{S} / \overline{C}).$$

The distribution of the mean angle ($\overline{\theta}$) for a circular pdf P(θ) will be given by:

$$P(\overline{C},\overline{S}) \, d\overline{C} \, d\overline{S} =
P(\overline{R},\overline{\theta}) \, d\overline{R} \, d\overline{\theta} =
\int_\Gamma \cdots \int_\Gamma \prod_{n=1}^N \left[ P(\theta_n) \, d\theta_n \right]$$

where $\Gamma$ is over any interval of length $2\pi$ and the integral is subject to the constraint that $\overline{S}$ and $\overline{C}$ are constant, or, alternatively, that $\overline{R}$ and $\overline{\theta}$ are constant.

The calculation of the distribution of the mean for most circular distributions is not analytically possible, and in order to carry out an analysis of variance, numerical or mathematical approximations are needed.

The central limit theorem may be applied to the distribution of the sample means. (main article: Central limit theorem for directional statistics). It can be shown that the distribution of $[\overline{C},\overline{S}]$ approaches a bivariate normal distribution in the limit of large sample size.

== Goodness of fit and significance testing ==
For cyclic data – (e.g., is it uniformly distributed) :

- Rayleigh test for a unimodal cluster
- Kuiper's test for possibly multimodal data.

== See also ==
- Circular correlation coefficient
- Complex normal distribution
- Wrapped distribution

== Books on directional statistics ==
- Batschelet, E. (1981). Circular statistics in biology. London: Academic Press. ISBN 0-12-081050-6.
- Fisher, N. I. (1993). Statistical Analysis of Circular Data. Cambridge University Press. ISBN 0-521-35018-2.
- Fisher, N. I.; Lewis, T.; Embleton, BJJ (1993). Statistical Analysis of Spherical Data. Cambridge University Press. ISBN 0-521-45699-1.
- Jammalamadaka, S. Rao; Sengupta, A. (2001). Topics in Circular Statistics. New Jersey: World Scientific. ISBN 981-02-3778-2.
- Mardia, K. V.; Jupp, P. (2000). Directional Statistics (2nd ed.). John Wiley and Sons Ltd. ISBN 0-471-95333-4.
- Ley, C.; Verdebout, T. (2017). Modern Directional Statistics. CRC Press Taylor & Francis Group. ISBN 978-1-4987-0664-3.
