= David Duvenaud =

Canadian computer scientist (born 1984)

- Born: 1983 (age 42–43); Winnipeg, Manitoba, Canada
- Education: University of Manitoba (BSc); University of British Columbia (MSc); Cambridge University (PhD)
- Known for: Neural ODE; Deep generative models; Gradual disempowerment
- Scientific career
- Workplaces: University of Toronto; Vector Institute; Anthropic
- Thesis: Automatic Model Construction with Gaussian Processes (2014)
- Doctoral advisor: Carl Rasmussen; Zoubin Ghahramani
- Website: www.cs.toronto.edu/~duvenaud

David Kristjanson Duvenaud (born 1983) is a Canadian computer scientist at the University of Toronto specializing in probabilistic machine learning, generative AI, and AI safety. He is a CIFAR AI chair since 2021 and a Schwartz Reisman Chair in Technology and Society since 2024.

== Education ==
Duvenaud was born in suburban Winnipeg, Manitoba. He received his B.Sc. in computer science from University of Manitoba in 2006 and his M.Sc. in computer science from University of British Columbia in 2010 under the supervision of Kevin P. Murphy. He received his PhD under the supervision of Carl Rasmussen and Zoubin Ghahramani from Cambridge University in 2014. After a postdoc at Harvard University in the group of Ryan P. Adams, he joined the faculty of the University of Toronto in 2016.

== Career and research ==
Duvenaud is an associate professor in the Department of Computer Science at the University of Toronto and a founding faculty member at the Vector Institute.. His research group initially focused on deep generative models, including work on generative models of molecules and neural ordinary differential equations, including a kind of continuous-time normalizing flow, for which his group received the NeurIPS best paper award in 2018.

In 2023, in response to growing concern from the widespread adoption of large language models, he pivoted his research into AI safety and did a sabbatical at Anthropic. There he led the Alignment Evaluations team, doing work on jailbreaks and developing evaluations for models' ability to surreptitiously conduct sabotage. His more recent work on AI safety has focused on concerns around "gradual disempowerment", the thesis that as artificial intelligence becomes more capable, the large-scale societal systems humans depend on—such as economies, cultures, and states—may progressively cease to serve human interests, because the alignment of these systems with human needs has historically depended on their reliance on human participation, which AI increasingly renders unnecessary.
