= Lists of statistics topics =

This article itemizes the various lists of statistics topics.

== Statistics ==
- Outline of statistics
- Outline of regression analysis
- Index of statistics articles
- List of scientific method topics
- List of analyses of categorical data
- List of fields of application of statistics
- List of graphical methods
- List of statistical software
  - Comparison of statistical packages
  - List of graphing software
  - Comparison of Gaussian process software
- List of statistical tests
- Test statistic
- List of stochastic processes topics
- List of matrices used in statistics
- Timeline of probability and statistics
- List of unsolved problems in statistics

== Probability ==
- Topic outline of probability
- List of probability topics
  - Catalog of articles in probability theory
- List of probability distributions
  - List of convolutions of probability distributions

== Glossaries and notations ==
- Glossary of experimental design
- Glossary of probability and statistics
- Notation in probability and statistics

== People ==
- List of actuaries
- List of statisticians
- List of mathematical probabilists
- Founders of statistics

== Publications ==
- List of publications in statistics
- List of probability journals
- List of statistics journals

== Organizations ==
- List of academic statistical associations
- List of national and international statistical services

== See also ==
- Lists of mathematics topics
