= Outline of statistics =

Overview of and topical guide to statistics

The following outline is provided as an overview of and topical guide to statistics:

Statistics is a field of inquiry that studies the collection, analysis, interpretation, and presentation of data. It is applicable to a wide variety of academic disciplines, from the physical and social sciences to the humanities; it is also used and misused for making informed decisions in all areas of business and government.

== Nature of statistics ==
Statistics can be described as all of the following:

- An academic discipline: one with academic departments, curricula and degrees; national and international societies; and specialized journals.
- A scientific field (a branch of science) – widely recognized category of specialized expertise within science, and typically embodies its own terminology and nomenclature. Such a field will usually be represented by one or more scientific journals, where peer reviewed research is published.
- A formal science – branch of knowledge concerned with formal systems.
- A mathematical science – field of science that is primarily mathematical in nature but may not be universally considered subfields of mathematics proper. Statistics, for example, is mathematical in its methods but grew out of political arithmetic which merged with inverse probability and grew through applications in the social sciences and some areas of physics and biometrics to become its own separate, though closely allied, field.

== History of statistics ==
- History of statistics
- Founders of statistics
- History of probability
- Timeline of probability and statistics

== Describing data ==
- Descriptive statistics
- Average
  - Mean
  - Median
  - Mode
- Measures of dispersion
  - Variance
  - Standard deviation
  - Median absolute deviation
- Correlation
- Polychoric correlation
- Outlier
- Statistical graphics
  - Histogram
  - Frequency distribution
  - Quantile
  - Survival function
  - Failure rate
  - Scatter plot
  - Bar chart

== Experiments and surveys ==
- Design of experiments
  - Optimal design
  - Factorial experiment
  - Restricted randomization
  - Repeated measures design
  - Randomized block design
  - Cross-over design
  - Randomization
- Statistical survey
- Opinion poll

=== Sampling ===
- Sampling theory
  - Sampling distribution
  - Stratified sampling
  - Quota sampling
  - Cluster sampling
- Biased sample
  - Spectrum bias
  - Survivorship bias

== Analysing data ==
- Regression analysis
  - Outline of regression analysis
  - Analysis of variance (ANOVA)
  - General linear model
  - Generalized linear model
  - Generalized least squares
  - Mixed model
  - Elastic net regularization
  - Ridge regression
  - Lasso (statistics)
- Survival analysis
- Density estimation
  - Kernel density estimation
  - Multivariate kernel density estimation
- Time series
  - Time series analysis
  - Box–Jenkins method
  - Frequency domain
  - Time domain
- Multivariate analysis
  - Principal component analysis (PCA)
  - Factor analysis
  - Cluster analysis
  - Multiple correspondence analysis
  - Nonlinear dimensionality reduction
- Robust statistics
  - Heteroskedasticity-consistent standard errors
  - Newey–West estimator
  - Generalized estimating equation
  - Bootstrapping (statistics)
- Statistical classification
  - Metric learning
  - Generative model
  - Discriminative model
  - Online machine learning
- Cross-validation (statistics)

== Filtering data ==
- Recursive Bayesian estimation
  - Kalman filter
  - Particle filter
- Moving average
- SQL

== Statistical inference ==
- Statistical inference
- Mathematical statistics
  - Likelihood function
  - Exponential family
  - Fisher information
  - Sufficient statistic
  - Ancillary statistic
  - Minimal sufficiency
  - Kullback–Leibler divergence
  - Nuisance parameter
  - Order statistic
- Bayesian inference
  - Bayes' theorem
  - Bayes estimator
  - Prior distribution
  - Posterior distribution
  - Conjugate prior
  - Posterior predictive distribution
  - Hierarchical bayes
  - Empirical Bayes method
- Frequentist inference
  - Statistical hypothesis testing
    - Null hypothesis
    - Alternative hypothesis
    - P-value
    - Significance level
    - Statistical power
    - Type I and type II errors
  - Likelihood-ratio test
  - Wald test
  - Score test
  - Sequential probability ratio test
  - Uniformly most powerful test
  - Exact test
  - Confidence interval
  - Prediction interval
- Decision theory
  - Optimal decision
  - Type I and type II errors
  - Decision rule
  - Minimax
  - Loss function
    - Mean squared error
    - Mean absolute error
- Estimation theory
  - Estimator
  - Bayes estimator
  - Maximum likelihood
  - Trimmed estimator
  - M-estimator
  - Minimum-variance unbiased estimator
  - Consistent estimator
  - Efficiency (statistics)
  - Completeness (statistics)
- Non-parametric statistics
  - Nonparametric regression
  - Kernels
  - Kernel method
- Statistical learning theory
  - Rademacher complexity
  - Vapnik–Chervonenkis dimension
  - Probably approximately correct learning

== Probability distributions ==
- Probability distribution
  - Symmetric probability distribution
  - Unimodal probability distribution
- Conditional probability distribution
- Probability density function
- Cumulative distribution function
- Characteristic function
- List of probability distributions

== Random variables ==
- Random variable
- Central moment
- L-moment
- Algebra of random variables

== Probability theory ==
- Probability
- Conditional probability
- Law of large numbers
- Central limit theorem
- Concentration inequality
- Convergence of random variables

== Computational statistics ==
- Computational statistics
  - Markov chain Monte Carlo
  - Bootstrapping (statistics)
  - Jackknife resampling
  - Integrated nested Laplace approximations
  - Nested sampling algorithm
  - Metropolis–Hastings algorithm
  - Importance sampling
  - Mathematical optimization
    - Convex optimization
    - Linear programming
    - Linear matrix inequality
    - Quadratic programming
    - Quadratically constrained quadratic program
    - Second-order cone programming
    - Semidefinite programming
    - Newton-Raphson
    - Gradient descent
    - Conjugate gradient method
    - Mirror descent
    - Proximal gradient method
    - Geometric programming

== Statistics software ==
- List of statistical packages

== Statistics organizations ==
- List of academic statistical associations
- List of national and international statistical services

== Statistics publications ==
- List of statistics journals
- List of important publications in statistics

== Persons influential in the field of statistics ==
- List of statisticians

== See also ==
- Combinatorics
- Glossary of probability and statistics
- Index of statistics articles
- List of fields of application of statistics
- List of graphical methods
- Lists of statistics topics
- Monte Carlo method
- Notation in probability and statistics
- Outline of probability
- Philosophy of statistics
- Simulation
