= Probability and statistics =

Probability and statistics are two closely related fields in mathematics that are sometimes combined for academic purposes. They are covered in multiple articles and lists:

- Probability
- Statistics
- Glossary of probability and statistics
- Notation in probability and statistics
- Timeline of probability and statistics

Publications named for both fields include the following:

- Brazilian Journal of Probability and Statistics
- Counterexamples in Probability and Statistics
- Probability and Mathematical Statistics
- Theory of Probability and Mathematical Statistics
