= Lists of publications in science =

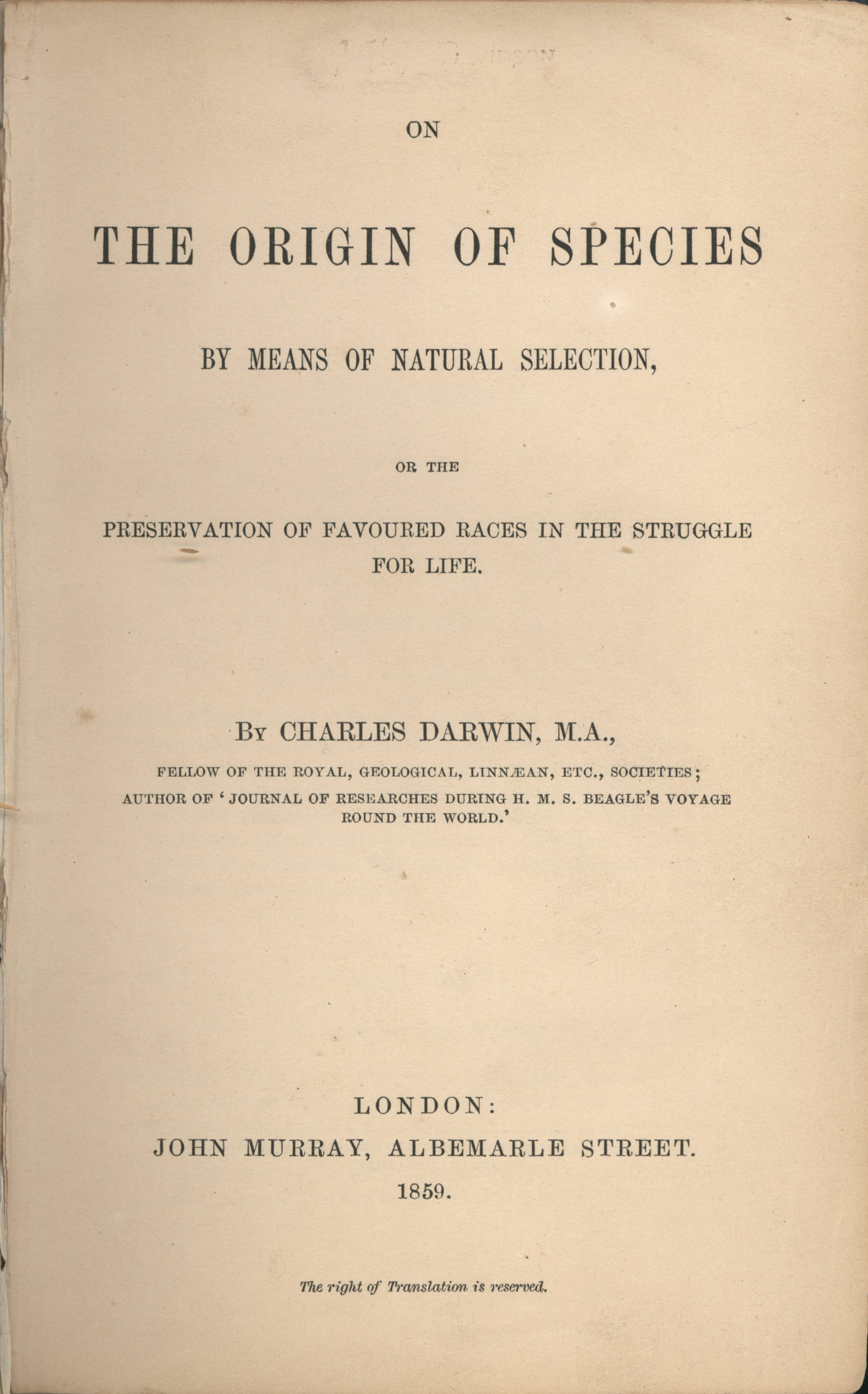
Title page of the 1859 Murray edition of the Origin of Species by Charles Darwin.

Lists of publications in science cover publications in various fields of science that have introduced a major new topic, made a significant advance in knowledge or have significantly influenced the world.

- List of publications in biology
- List of publications in chemistry
- List of publications in data science
- List of publications in economics
- List of publications in mathematics
- List of publications in medicine
- List of publications in philosophy
- List of publications in physics
- List of publications in statistics
- List of humor research publications
- Bibliography of sociology
