= Wilks's lambda distribution =

Probability distribution used in multivariate hypothesis testing

In statistics, Wilks' lambda distribution (named for Samuel S. Wilks), is a probability distribution used in multivariate hypothesis testing, especially with regard to the likelihood-ratio test and multivariate analysis of variance (MANOVA).

== Definitions ==
Wilks' lambda distribution is defined from two independent Wishart distributed variables as the ratio distribution of their determinants,

given

$$\mathbf{A} \sim W_p(\Sigma, m) \qquad \mathbf{B} \sim W_p(\Sigma, n)$$

independent and with $m \ge p$

$$\lambda = \frac{\det(\mathbf{A})}{\det(\mathbf{A+B})} = \frac{1}{\det(\mathbf{I}+\mathbf{A}^{-1}\mathbf{B})} \sim \Lambda(p,m,n)$$

where p is the number of dimensions. In the context of likelihood-ratio tests m is typically the error degrees of freedom, and n is the hypothesis degrees of freedom, so that $n+m$ is the total degrees of freedom.

== Properties ==
There is a symmetry among the parameters of the Wilks distribution,

$$\Lambda(p, m, n) \sim \Lambda(n, m + n - p, p)$$

=== Approximations ===
Computations or tables of the Wilks' distribution for higher dimensions are not readily available and one usually resorts to approximations. One approximation is attributed to M. S. Bartlett and works for large m allows Wilks' lambda to be approximated with a chi-squared distribution

$\left(\frac{p-n+1}{2}-m\right)\log \Lambda(p,m,n) \sim \chi^2_{np}.$

Another approximation is attributed to C. R. Rao.

== Related distributions ==
The distribution can be related to a product of independent beta-distributed random variables

$$u_i \sim B\left(\frac{m+i-p}{2},\frac{p}{2}\right)$$
$$\prod_{i=1}^n u_i \sim \Lambda(p,m,n).$$

As such it can be regarded as a multivariate generalization of the beta distribution.

It follows directly that for a one-dimension problem, when the Wishart distributions are one-dimensional with $p=1$ (i.e., chi-squared-distributed), then the Wilks' distribution equals the beta-distribution with a certain parameter set,

$$\Lambda(1,m,n) \sim B\left(\frac{m}{2},\frac{n}{2}\right).$$

From the relations between a beta and an F-distribution, Wilks' lambda can be related to the F-distribution when one of the parameters of the Wilks lambda distribution is either 1 or 2, e.g.,

$$\frac{1 - \Lambda(p, m, 1)}{\Lambda(p, m, 1)} \sim \frac{p}{m - p + 1} F_{p, m-p+1},$$

and

$$\frac{1 - \sqrt{\Lambda(p, m, 2)}}{\sqrt{\Lambda(p, m, 2)}} \sim \frac{p}{m - p + 1} F_{2p, 2(m-p+1)}.$$

== See also ==
- Chi-squared distribution
- Dirichlet distribution
- F-distribution
- Gamma distribution
- Hotelling's T-squared distribution
- Student's t-distribution
- Wishart distribution
