= Counterexamples in Probability =

2013 book by J. M. Stoyanov

- Title page for Counterexamples in Probability (1987)
- Author: Jordan M. Stoyanov
- Subject: Probability theory
- Genre: Mathematics
- Publisher: Wiley
- Publication date: 1987
- ISBN: 978-0-471-91649-9

Counterexamples in Probability is a mathematics book by Jordan M. Stoyanov. Intended to serve as a supplemental text for classes on probability theory and related topics, it covers cases where a mathematical proposition might seem to be true but actually turns out to be false.

First published in 1987, the book received a second edition in 1997 and a third in 2013.

== Reception ==
Robert W. Hayden, reviewing the book for the Mathematical Association of America, found it unsuitable for reading cover-to-cover, while recommending it as a reference for "graduate students and probabilists...the small audience whose needs match the title and level." Similarly, Geoffrey Grimmett called the book an "excellent browse" that, despite being a "serious work of scholarship" would not be suitable as a course textbook. R. W. Hammett wrote that it "should become a classic supplement" for those students who wish to go above and beyond their ordinary course requirements, and that "it should also become essential to those who plan to work in the field." D. R. Grey gave it a positive evaluation as a reference text while noting that the counterexamples it includes range "from those accessible to first-year undergraduates ... to those only comprehensible to specialists in stochastic processes".

Richard Durrett gave a more negative review, saying that "Most readers will learn a few interesting things" but regarding most of the counterexamples to be well-known or redundant. While Durrett appreciated the illustrations by A. T. Fomenko, the more positive review by F. W. Steutel did not, calling them a "rather unhappy cross" between Dalí and Escher.

== Publication history ==
- Stoyanov, J. M. (1987). Counterexamples in Probability (1st ed.). Wiley. ISBN 978-0-471-91649-9.
- Stoyanov, J. M. (1997). Counterexamples in Probability (2nd ed.). Wiley. ISBN 978-0-471-96538-1.
- Stoyanov, J. M. (2013). Counterexamples in Probability (3nd ed.). Dover. ISBN 978-0-486-49998-7.

The book was also issued in Russian editions in 1999 and 2012.

== See also ==
- Counterexamples in Probability and Statistics, a different book with similar subject matter
