= Counterexamples in Probability and Statistics =

1986 book by Romano and Siegel

- Title page for Counterexamples in Probability and Statistics (1986)
- Author: Joseph P. Romano; Andrew F. Siegel
- Language: English
- Publication date: 1986
- Publication place: United States
- ISBN: 0-534-05568-0

Counterexamples in Probability and Statistics is a mathematics book by Joseph P. Romano and Andrew F. Siegel. It began as Romano's senior thesis at Princeton University under Siegel's supervision, and was intended for use as a supplemental work to augment standard textbooks on statistics and probability theory.

== Reception ==
R. D. Lee gave the book a strong recommendation despite certain reservations, particularly that the organization of the book was intimidating to a large fraction of its potential audience: "There are plenty of good teachers of A-level statistics who know little or nothing about σ-fields or Borel subsets, the subjects of the first 3 or 4 pages." Reviewing new books for Mathematics Magazine, Paul J. Campbell called Romano and Siegel's work "long overdue" and quipped, "it's too bad we can't count on more senior professionals to compile such useful handbooks."

Eric R. Ziegel's review in Technometrics was unenthusiastic, saying that the book was "only for mathematical statisticians" rather than "practitioners in the physical, chemical, and engineering sciences." Similarly, Rollin Brant found the book to have few data-based examples and suggested that a better title would have been Counterexamples in Probability and Theoretical Statistics. With that proviso, he deemed the book "useful and entertaining" and suggested that researchers as well as students "will find this book a valuable resource."

== Publication history ==
- Romano, J. P.; Siegel, A. F. (1986). Counterexamples in Probability and Statistics. Wadsworth & Brooks/Cole Advanced Books and Software. ISBN 0-534-05568-0. MR 0831223.

== See also ==
- Counterexamples in Probability, a different book with similar subject matter
