= Founders of statistics =

Statistics is the theory and application of mathematics to the scientific method including hypothesis generation, experimental design, sampling, data collection, data summarization, estimation, prediction and inference from those results to the population from which the experimental sample was drawn. Statisticians are skilled people who thus apply statistical methods. Hundreds of statisticians are notable. This article lists statisticians who have been especially instrumental in the development of theoretical and applied statistics.

Name	Nationality	Birth	Death	Contribution	References
Al-Kindi	Abbasid Caliphate	801	873	Developed the first code breaking algorithm based on frequency analysis. He wrote a book entitled "Manuscript on Deciphering Cryptographic Messages", containing detailed discussions on statistics	
Graunt, John	English	1620	1674	Pioneer of demography who produced the first life table	
Bayes, Thomas	English	1702	1761	Developed the interpretation of probability now known as Bayesian probability	
Laplace, Pierre-Simon	French	1749	1827	Co-invented Bayesian statistics. Invented exponential families (Laplace transform), conjugate prior distributions, asymptotic analysis of estimators (including negligibility of regular priors). Used maximum-likelihood and posterior-mode estimation and considered (robust) loss functions	
Playfair, William	Scottish	1759	1823	Pioneer of statistical graphics	
Carl Friedrich Gauss	German	1777	1855	Invented least squares estimation methods (with Legendre). Used loss functions and maximum-likelihood estimation	
Quetelet, Adolphe	Belgian	1796	1874	Pioneered the use of probability and statistics in the social sciences	
Nightingale, Florence	English	1820	1910	Applied statistical analysis to health problems, contributing to the establishment of epidemiology and public health practice. Developed statistical graphics especially for mobilizing public opinion. First female member of the Royal Statistical Society.	
Galton, Francis	English	1822	1911	Invented the concepts of standard deviation, correlation, regression	
Thiele, Thorvald N.	Danish	1838	1910	Introduced cumulants and the term "likelihood". Introduced a Kalman filter in time-series	
Peirce, Charles Sanders	American	1839	1914	Formulated modern statistics in "Illustrations of the Logic of Science" (1877–1878) and "A Theory of Probable Inference" (1883). With a repeated measures design, introduced blinded, controlled randomized experiments (before Fisher). Invented optimal design for experiments on gravity, in which he "corrected the means". He used correlation, smoothing, and improved the treatment of outliers. Introduced terms "confidence" and "likelihood" (before Neyman and Fisher). While largely a frequentist, Peirce's possible world semantics introduced the "propensity" theory of probability. See the historical books of Stephen Stigler	
Edgeworth, Francis Ysidro	Irish	1845	1926	Revived exponential families (Laplace transforms) in statistics. Extended Laplace's (asymptotic) theory of maximum-likelihood estimation. Introduced basic results on information, which were extended and popularized by R. A. Fisher	
Pearson, Karl	English	1857	1936	Numerous innovations, including the development of the Pearson chi-squared test and the Pearson correlation. Founded the Biometrical Society and Biometrika, the first journal of mathematical statistics and biometry	
Spearman, Charles	English	1863	1945	Extended the Pearson correlation coefficient to the Spearman's rank correlation coefficient	
Gosset, William Sealy (known as "Student")	English	1876	1937	Discovered the Student t distribution and invented the Student's t-test	
Anderson, Oskar Johann Viktor (also known as Anderson, Oskar Nikolaevich)	Russian, Bulgarian, German	1887	1960	A leading representative of the so-called Continental School of statistics. Invented the variate difference method for analyzing time series at the same time but independently from Gosset. A pioneer of random sampling in demographics and of quantitative methods applied to socio-economic sciences.	
Fisher, Ronald	English	1890	1962	Wrote the textbooks and articles that defined the academic discipline of statistics, inspiring the creation of statistics departments at universities throughout the world. Systematized previous results with informative terminology, substantially improving previous results with mathematical analysis (and claims). Developed the analysis of variance, clarified the method of maximum likelihood (without the uniform priors appearing in some previous versions), invented the concept of sufficient statistics, developed Edgeworth's use of exponential families and information, introducing observed Fisher information, and many theoretical concepts and practical methods, particularly for the design of experiments	
Bonferroni, Carlo Emilio	Italian	1892	1960	Invented the Bonferroni correction for multiple comparisons	
Wilcoxon, Frank	Irish-American	1892	1965	Invented two statistical tests: Wilcoxon rank-sum test and the Wilcoxon signed-rank test	
Neyman, Jerzy	Polish-American	1894	1981	Discovered the confidence interval and co-developed the Neyman–Pearson lemma	
Deming, W. Edwards	American	1900	1993	Developed methods for statistical quality control	
Pearson, Egon	English	1895	1980	Co-developed the Neyman–Pearson lemma of statistical hypothesis testing	
de Finetti, Bruno	Italian	1906	1985	Pioneer of the "operational subjective" conception of probability. Used this as the basis for exposition of the Bayesian method of statistical analysis. Developed the representation theorem for exchangeable random variables showing that they are the basis of the IID model in statistics.	
Kendall, Maurice	English	1907	1983	Co-developed methods for assessing statistical randomness; invented Kendall tau rank correlation coefficient	
Henderson, Charles Roy	American	1911	1989	Invented methods for estimating variance components in multiway factorial models with unequal subclass numbers. Invented the mixed-model equations to provide best linear unbiased estimates of fixed effects and best linear unbiased predictors of random effects in mixed models.	
Tukey, John	American	1915	2000	Jointly popularized Fast Fourier transformation, pioneer of exploratory data analysis and graphical presentation of data, developed the jackknife for variance estimation, invented the box plot.	
Blackwell, David	American	1919	2010	Co-developed Rao–Blackwell theorem and wrote one of the first Bayesian textbooks, Basic Statistics.	
Rao, Calyampudi Radhakrishna	Indian	1920	2023	Co-developed Cramér–Rao bound and Rao–Blackwell theorem, invented MINQUE method of variance component estimation.	
Cox, David	English	1924	2022	Developed the proportional hazards model for the analysis of survival data	
Efron, Bradley	American	1938		Invented the bootstrap resampling technique for deriving an empirical distribution of an estimate of a model parameter	

== Founders of departments of statistics ==
The role of a department of statistics is discussed in a 1949 article by Harold Hotelling, which helped to spur the creation of many departments of statistics.

Year	Country	University	Founder	References
1911	England	University College London	Pearson, Karl	
1918	USA	Department of Biostatistics, Johns Hopkins Bloomberg School of Public Health	Pearl, Raymond	
1929	Sweden	Lund University	Sven Dag Wicksell	
~1931	India	Indian Statistical Institute	Prasanta Chandra Mahalanobis	
~1931	USA	Columbia University	Hotelling, Harold	
1931	USA	University of Pennsylvania	—	
1933	USA	Iowa State University	Snedecor, George W.	
1935	USA	George Washington University	Weida, Frank	
1941	USA	North Carolina State University	Cox, Gertrude	
1942	Sweden	Uppsala University	Wold, Herman	
1947	England	University of Manchester	Bartlett, M. S.	
1947	USA	Department of Biometry and Statistics, Cornell University	Federer, Walter T.	
1948	USA	Stanford University	—	
1948	India	University of Mumbai	M. C. Chakrabarti	
1949	USA	University of Michigan	Velz, Clarence	
1949	USA	University of North Carolina at Chapel Hill	—	
1949	USA	University of Chicago	—	
1949	USA	Virginia Tech	Harshbarger, Boyd	
~1950	Sweden	Stockholm University	—	
1950	Israel	Hebrew University of Jerusalem	—	
1953	England	Cambridge University, Statistics Lab	Wishart, John	
1953	India	University of Pune	Huzurbazar, V. S.	
1955	USA	University of California, Berkeley	Neyman, Jerzy	
1957	USA	Harvard University	Cochran, William G. Mosteller, Frederick	
1957	Australia	University of Sydney	Lancaster, Henry Oliver	
1958	USA	University of Minnesota	—	
1959	USA	Florida State University	Ralph A. Bradley	
1960	USA	University of Wisconsin–Madison	George E. P. Box	
1961	USA	Colorado State University	Franklin A. Graybill	
1962	USA	University of Florida	Brandt, Alva Esmond	
1962	USA	Texas A&M University	Hartley, Herman Otto	
1963	USA	Yale University	Anscombe, Francis	
1963	USA	Purdue University	—	
1964	Bangladesh	Institute of Statistical Research and Training	Hussain, Q.M.	
1965	USA	Princeton University	Tukey, John W.	
1965	USA	University of Iowa	Hogg, Robert V.	
1966	USA	Carnegie Mellon University	Morris H. DeGroot; Gaver Jr, Donald P.	
1966	Scotland	University of Glasgow	Aitchison, John; Silvey, David	
1967	Canada	University of Waterloo	Sprott, David A.	
1968	USA	Pennsylvania State University	Bartoo, James	
1969	India	Madras Christian College	Gift Siromoney	
1969	Hong Kong	University of Hong Kong	Saw Swee Hock	
1970	USA	Department of Biostatistics, University of Washington School of Public Health	—	
1973	USA	Ohio State University	Whitney, D. Ransom	
1973	Germany	Universität Dortmund	Eicker, Friedhelm	
1975	India	Aligarh Muslim University	S.M. Ali	
1979	Canada	University of Toronto	Donald A. S. Fraser	
1981	India	Vidyasagar University	Gain, Anil Kumar	
1982	Hong Kong	Chinese University of Hong Kong	Tong, Howell	
1984	India	Banaras Hindu University	Singh, S.N.	
1985	USA	University of Illinois Urbana-Champaign	Sacks, Jerome	
1986	USA	Northwestern University	Meyer Dwass	
1987	USA	Rice University	James R. Thompson	
1988	England	University of Oxford	Hinkley, D. V.	
1994	New Zealand	The University of Auckland	Scott, Alastair; Seber, George	
1996	USA	University of Virginia School of Medicine	Harrell, Frank E.	
1997	USA	University of Pittsburgh	Sampson, Allan R.	
1998	USA	University of California, Los Angeles	Jan de Leeuw	

== See also ==
- List of statisticians
- History of statistics
- Timeline of probability and statistics
- List of people considered father or mother of a scientific field
