= List of fields of application of statistics =

Statistics is the mathematical science involving the collection, analysis and interpretation of data. A number of specialties have evolved to apply statistical and methods to various disciplines. Certain topics have "statistical" in their name but relate to manipulations of probability distributions rather than to statistical analysis.

- Actuarial science is the discipline that applies mathematical and statistical methods to assess risk in the insurance and finance industries.
- Astrostatistics is the discipline that applies statistical analysis to the understanding of astronomical data.
- Biostatistics is a branch of biology that studies biological phenomena and observations by means of statistical analysis, and includes medical statistics.
- Business analytics is a rapidly developing business process that applies statistical methods to data sets (often very large) to develop new insights and understanding of business performance & opportunities
- Chemometrics is the science of relating measurements made on a chemical system or process to the state of the system via application of mathematical or statistical methods.
- Demography is the statistical study of all populations. It can be a very general science that can be applied to any kind of dynamic population, that is, one that changes over time or space.
- Econometrics is a branch of economics that applies statistical methods to the empirical study of economic theories and relationships.
- Environmental statistics is the application of statistical methods to environmental science. Weather, climate, air and water quality are included, as are studies of plant and animal populations.
- Epidemiology is the study of factors affecting the health and illness of populations, and serves as the foundation and logic of interventions made in the interest of public health and preventive medicine.
- Forensic statistics is the application of probability models and statistical techniques to scientific evidence, such as DNA evidence, and the law. In contrast to "everyday" statistics, to not engender bias or unduly draw conclusions, forensic statisticians report likelihoods as likelihood ratios (LR).
- Spatial statistics is a branch of applied statistics that deals with the analysis of spatial data
  - Geostatistics is a branch of geography that deals with the analysis of data from disciplines such as petroleum geology, hydrogeology, hydrology, meteorology, oceanography, geochemistry, geography.
- Jurimetrics is the application of probability and statistics to law.
- Machine learning is the subfield of computer science that formulates algorithms in order to make predictions from data.
- Operations research (or operational research) is an interdisciplinary branch of applied mathematics and formal science that uses methods such as mathematical modeling, statistics, and algorithms to arrive at optimal or near optimal solutions to complex problems; Management science focuses on problems in the business world.
- Population ecology is a sub-field of ecology that deals with the dynamics of species populations and how these populations interact with the environment.
- Psychometrics is the theory and technique of educational and psychological measurement of knowledge, abilities, attitudes, and personality traits.
- Quality control reviews the factors involved in manufacturing and production; it can make use of statistical sampling of product items to aid decisions in process control or in accepting deliveries.
- Quantitative psychology is the science of statistically explaining and changing mental processes and behaviors in humans.
- Reliability engineering is the study of the ability of a system or component to perform its required functions under stated conditions for a specified period of time.
- Social statistics is the use of statistical measurement systems to study human behavior in a social environment.
- Statistical finance, an area of econophysics, is an empirical attempt to shift finance from its normative roots to a positivist framework using exemplars from statistical physics with an emphasis on emergent or collective properties of financial markets.
- Statistical mechanics is the application of probability theory, which includes mathematical tools for dealing with large populations, to the field of mechanics, which is concerned with the motion of particles or objects when subjected to a force.
- Statistical physics is one of the fundamental theories of physics, and uses methods of probability theory in solving physical problems.
- Statistical signal processing utilizes the statistical properties of signals to perform signal processing tasks.
- Statistical thermodynamics is the study of the microscopic behaviors of thermodynamic systems using probability theory and provides a molecular level interpretation of thermodynamic quantities such as work, heat, free energy, and entropy.

== See also ==
- List of statistics topics
