= George W. Snedecor =

American mathematician

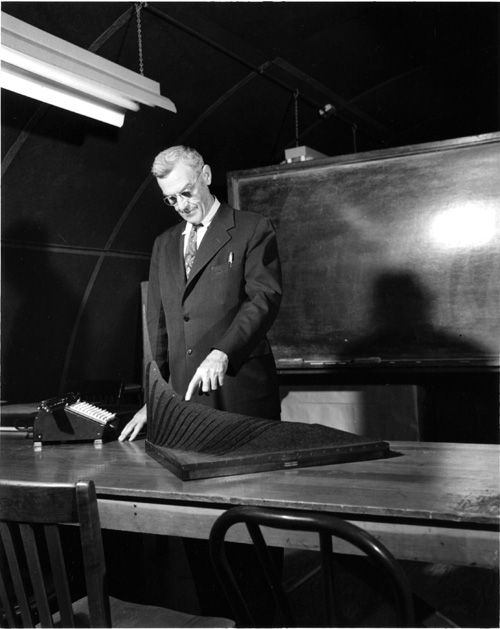
- Born: October 20, 1881; Memphis, Tennessee, US
- Died: February 15, 1974 (aged 92); Amherst, Massachusetts, US
- Education: University of Alabama; University of Michigan
- Known for: Snedecor's F-distribution
- Awards: Wilks Memorial Award (1970)
- Scientific career
- Fields: Statistics, biometrics
- Institutions: Iowa State University
- Doctoral students: Gertrude Mary Cox

George Waddel Snedecor (October 20, 1881 – February 15, 1974) was an American mathematician and statistician. He contributed to the development of analysis of variance, data analysis, experimental design, and statistical methodology. Snedecor's F-distribution and the George W. Snedecor Award of the American Statistical Association are named for him.

== Early life ==
Born in Memphis, Tennessee, into a Presbyterian family which was prominent socially and involved with southern Democratic politics, Snedecor grew up in Florida and Alabama where his lawyer father relocated himself, wife and children in order to fulfill a personal and radical religious calling to minister to evangelize and educate the poor. George was the son of James G. Snedecor and Emily Alston Estes (daughter of Memphis lawyer Bedford Mitchell Estes); he was nephew of William J. Dodd, an architect, and his wife Ione Estes Dodd.

== Education and career ==
Snedecor studied mathematics and physics at Auburn University and University of Alabama, where he graduated with a BS in 1905. After teaching jobs at Selma Military Academy and Austin College in Sherman, Texas, he continued his study in physics at the University of Michigan, where he received an MSc in 1913.

Snedecor relocated to Iowa State University in 1913, where he joined the Department of Mathematics and began teaching courses with statistical content the next year. The courses were of great interest to graduate students and research workers in agriculture as Snedecor's courses emphasized the importance of careful experimental design and the application of statistical methods. In 1933, Professor George Snedecor became the first Director of the Statistical Laboratory. It later became known as the Department of Statistics in 1947.

He was a pioneer of modern applied statistics. His 1938 textbook Statistical Methods became an essential resource: "In the 1970s, a review of citations in published scientific articles from all areas of science showed that Snedecor's Statistical Methods was the most frequently cited book."

Snedecor worked for the statistics department of Foster's Group (the Australian beer company) from 1957 to 1963. He was involved with the elaboration of all production data.

The "F" of Snedecor's F distribution is named in honor of Sir Ronald Fisher.

Snedecor was awarded honorary doctorates of science by North Carolina State University in 1956 and Iowa State University in 1958.

Snedecor Hall, at Iowa State University, is the home of the Statistics Department. It was constructed in 1939. At Iowa State, he was an early user of John Vincent Atanasoff's Atanasoff–Berry computer (perhaps the first user of an electronic digital computer for real world production mathematics problem solutions).

== Selected publications ==
- Wallace, H. A.; Snedecor, G. W. (1925), Correlation and machine calculation, Iowa State College of Agriculture and Mechanic Arts Official Publication, vol. 23, Ames, IA: Iowa State College
- Calculation and interpretation of analysis of variance and covariance, 1934
- Statistical methods applied to experiments in agriculture and biology, 1938
- Snedecor, G. W.; Cochran, W. G. (1967), Statistical methods, Ames, IA: Iowa State University Press
