= Timeline of probability and statistics =

The following is a timeline of probability and statistics.

== Before 1600 ==
- 8th century – Al-Khalil, an Arab mathematician studying cryptology, wrote the Book of Cryptographic Messages. The work has been lost, but based on the reports of later authors, it contained the first use of permutations and combinations to list all possible Arabic words with and without vowels.
- 9th century - Al-Kindi was the first to use frequency analysis to decipher encrypted messages and developed the first code breaking algorithm. He wrote a book entitled Manuscript on Deciphering Cryptographic Messages, containing detailed discussions on statistics and cryptanalysis. Al-Kindi also made the earliest known use of statistical inference.
- 13th century – An important contribution of Ibn Adlan was on sample size for use of frequency analysis.
- 13th century – the first known calculation of the probability for throwing 3 dices is published in the Latin poem De vetula.
- 1560s (published 1663) – Cardano's Liber de ludo aleae attempts to calculate probabilities of dice throws. He demonstrates the efficacy of defining odds as the ratio of favourable to unfavourable outcomes (which implies that the probability of an event is given by the ratio of favourable outcomes to the total number of possible outcomes).
- 1577 – Bartolomé de Medina defends probabilism, the view that in ethics one may follow a probable opinion even if the opposite is more probable

== 17th century ==
- 1654 – Blaise Pascal and Pierre de Fermat create the mathematical theory of probability,
- 1657 – Chistiaan Huygens's De ratiociniis in ludo aleae is the first book on mathematical probability,
- 1662 – John Graunt's Natural and Political Observations Made upon the Bills of Mortality makes inferences from statistical data on deaths in London,
- 1666 – In Le Journal des Sçavans xxxi, 2 August 1666 (359–370(=364)) appears a review of the third edition (1665) of John Graunt's Observations on the Bills of Mortality. This review gives a summary of 'plusieurs reflexions curieuses', of which the second are Graunt's data on life expectancy. This review is used by Nicolaus Bernoulli in his De Usu Artis Conjectandi in Jure (1709).
- 1669 – Christiaan Huygens and his brother Lodewijk discuss between August and December that year Graunts mortality table (Graunt 1662, p. 62) in letters #1755
- 1693 – Edmond Halley prepares the first mortality tables statistically relating death rate to age,

== 18th century ==
- 1710 – John Arbuthnot argues that the constancy of the ratio of male to female births is a sign of divine providence,
- 1713 – Posthumous publication of Jacob Bernoulli's Ars Conjectandi, containing the first derivation of a law of large numbers,
- 1724 – Abraham de Moivre studies mortality statistics and the foundation of the theory of annuities in Annuities upon Lives,
- 1733 – de Moivre introduces the normal distribution to approximate the binomial distribution in probability,
- 1739 – David Hume's Treatise of Human Nature argues that inductive reasoning is unjustified,
- 1761 – Thomas Bayes proves Bayes' theorem,
- 1786 – William Playfair's Commercial and Political Atlas introduces graphs and bar charts of data,

== 19th century ==
- 1801 – Carl Friedrich Gauss predicts the orbit of Ceres using a line of best fit
- 1805 – Adrien-Marie Legendre introduces the method of least squares for fitting a curve to a given set of observations,
- 1814 – Pierre-Simon Laplace's Essai philosophique sur les probabilités defends a definition of probabilities in terms of equally possible cases, introduces generating functions and Laplace transforms, uses conjugate priors for exponential families, proves an early version of the Bernstein–von Mises theorem on the asymptotic irrelevance of prior distributions on the limiting posterior distribution and the role of the Fisher information on asymptotically normal posterior modes.
- 1835 – Adolphe Quetelet's Treatise on Man introduces social science statistics and the concept of the "average man",
- 1866 – John Venn's Logic of Chance defends the frequency interpretation of probability.
- 1877–1883 – Charles Sanders Peirce outlines frequentist statistics, emphasizing the use of objective randomization in experiments and in sampling. Peirce also invented an optimally designed experiment for regression.
- 1880 – Thorvald N. Thiele gives a mathematical analysis of Brownian motion, introduces the likelihood function, and invents cumulants.
- 1888 – Francis Galton introduces the concept of correlation,
- 1900 – Louis Bachelier analyzes stock price movements as a stochastic process,

== 20th century ==
- 1908 – Student's t-distribution for the mean of small samples published in English (following earlier derivations in German).
- 1913 – Michel Plancherel states fundamental results in ergodic theory.
- 1920 – The central limit theorem in its modern form was formally stated.
- 1921 – John Maynard Keynes' Treatise on Probability defends a logical interpretation of probability. Sewall Wright develops path analysis.
- 1928 – L. H. C. Tippett and Ronald Fisher introduce extreme value theory,
- 1933 – Andrey Nikolaevich Kolmogorov publishes his book Basic notions of the calculus of probability (Grundbegriffe der Wahrscheinlichkeitsrechnung) which contains an axiomatization of probability based on measure theory,
- 1935 – Fisher's Design of Experiments (1st ed),
- 1937 – Jerzy Neyman introduces the concept of confidence interval in statistical testing,
- 1941 – Due to the World War II, research on detection theory started, leading to the receiver operating characteristic
- 1946 – Cox's theorem derives the axioms of probability from simple logical assumptions,
- 1948 – Claude Shannon's Mathematical Theory of Communication defines capacity of communication channels in terms of probabilities,
- 1953 – Nicholas Metropolis introduces the idea of thermodynamic simulated annealing methods

== See also ==
- Founders of statistics
- List of important publications in statistics
- History of probability
- History of statistics
