= List of publications in statistics =

This is a list of publications in statistics, organized by field.

Some reasons why a particular publication might be regarded as important:

- Topic creator – A publication that created a new topic
- Breakthrough – A publication that changed scientific knowledge significantly
- Influence – A publication which has significantly influenced the world or has had a massive impact on the teaching of statistics.

== Probability ==
Théorie analytique des probabilités
Author: Pierre-Simon Laplace
Publication data: 1820 (3rd ed.)
Online version: Internet Archive; CNRS, with more accurate character recognition; Gallica-Math, complete PDF and PDFs by section
Description: Introduced the Laplace transform, exponential families, and conjugate priors in Bayesian statistics. Pioneering asymptotic statistics, proved an early version of the Bernstein–von Mises theorem on the irrelevance of the (regular) prior distribution on the limiting posterior distribution, highlighting the asymptotic role of the Fisher information. Studies the influence of median and skewness in regression analysis. Inspired the field of robust regression, proposed the Laplace distribution and was the first to provide alternatives to Carl Friedrich Gauss's work on statistics.
Importance: Topic creator, Breakthrough, Influence

== Mathematical statistics ==
Mathematical Methods of Statistics

Author: Harald Cramér
Publication data: Princeton Mathematical Series, vol. 9. Princeton University Press, Princeton, N. J., 1946. xvi+575 pp. (A first version was published by Almqvist & Wiksell in Uppsala, Sweden, but had little circulation because of World War II.)
Description: Carefully written and extensive account of measure-theoretic probability for statisticians, along with careful mathematical treatment of classical statistics.
Importance: Made measure-theoretic probability the standard language for advanced statistics in the English-speaking world, following its earlier adoption in France and the USSR.

Statistical Decision Functions

Author: Abraham Wald
Publication data: 1950. John Wiley & Sons.
Description: Exposition of statistical decision theory as a foundations of statistics. Included earlier results of Wald on sequential analysis and the sequential probability ratio test and on Wald's complete class theorem characterizing admissible decision rules as limits of Bayesian procedures.
Importance: Raised the mathematical status of statistical theory and attracted mathematical statisticians like John von Neumann, Aryeh Dvoretzky, Jacob Wolfowitz, Jack C. Kiefer, and David Blackwell, providing greater ties with economic theory and operations research. Spurred further work on decision theory.

Testing Statistical Hypotheses

Author: Erich Leo Lehmann
Publication data: 1959. John Wiley & Sons.
Description: Exposition of statistical hypothesis testing using the statistical decision theory of Abraham Wald, with some use of measure-theoretic probability.
Importance: Made Wald's ideas accessible. Collected and organized many results of statistical theory that were scattered throughout journal articles, civilizing statistics.

== Bayesian statistics ==
An Essay Towards Solving a Problem in the Doctrine of Chances

Author: Thomas Bayes
Publication data: 1763-12-23
Online version: "An Essay towards solving a Problem in the Doctrine of Chances. By the late Rev. Mr. Bayes, F.R.S. communicated by Mr. Price, in a Letter to John Canton, A.M. F.R.S." (PDF). Department of Mathematics, University of York.
Description: In this paper Bayes addresses the problem of using a sequence of identical "trials" to determine the per-trial probability of "success" – the so-called inverse probability problem. It later inspired the theorem that bears his name (Bayes' theorem). See also Pierre Simon de Laplace.
Importance: Topic creator, Breakthrough, Influence

On Small Differences in Sensation

Author: Charles Sanders Peirce and Joseph Jastrow
Publication data: Peirce, Charles Sanders; Jastrow, Joseph (1885). "On Small Differences in Sensation". Memoirs of the National Academy of Sciences. 3: 73–83.
Online version: http://psychclassics.yorku.ca/Peirce/small-diffs.htm
Description: Peirce and Jastrow use logistic regression to estimate subjective probabilities of subjects's judgments of the heavier of two measurements, following a randomized controlled repeated measures design.
Importance: Pioneered elicitation of subjective probabilities.

Truth and Probability

Author: Frank P. Ramsey
Publication data: * Ramsey, Frank Plumpton; "Truth and Probability" (PDF), Chapter VII in The Foundations of Mathematics and other Logical Essays (1931).
Online version: https://web.archive.org/web/20080227205205/http://cepa.newschool.edu/het//texts/ramsey/ramsess.pdf
Description: Ramsey proposes elucidating a person's subjective probability for a proposition using a sequence of bets. Ramsey described his work as an elaboration of some pragmatic ideas of C. S. Peirce, which were expressed in "How to Make Our Ideas Clear".
Importance: Popularized the "Ramsey test" for eliciting subjective probabilities.

Bayesian Inference in Statistical Analysis

Author: George E. P. Box and George C. Tiao
Publication data: Addison Wesley Publishing Co., 1973. Reprinted 1992: Wiley ISBN 0471574287
Description: The first complete analysis of Bayesian Inference for many statistical problems.
Importance: Includes a large body of research on Bayesian analysis for outlier problems, variance components, linear models and multivariate statistics.

Theory of Probability

Author: Bruno de Finetti
Publication data: Two volumes, A.F.M. Smith and A. Machi (trs.), New York: John Wiley & Sons, Inc., 1974, 1975.
Description: The first detailed statement of the operational subjective position, dating from the author's research in the 1920s and 30s.
Importance: Emphasizes exchangeable random variables which are often mixtures of independent random variables. Argues for finitely additive probability measures that need not be countably additive. Emphasizes expectations rather than probability measures.

Introduction to statistical decision theory

Author: John W. Pratt, Howard Raiffa, and Robert Schlaifer
Publication data: preliminary edition, 1965. Cambridge, Mass.: MIT Press, 1995.
Description: Extensive exposition of statistical decision theory, statistics, and decision analysis from a Bayesian standpoint. Many examples and problems come from business and economics.
Importance: Greatly extended the scope of applied Bayesian statistics by using conjugate priors for exponential families. Extensive treatment of sequential decision making, for example mining decisions. For many years, it was required for all doctoral students at Harvard Business School.

== Multivariate analysis ==
An Introduction to Multivariate Analysis

Authors: Theodore W. Anderson
Publication data: 1958, John Wiley
Description:
Importance: This textbook educated a generation of theorists and applied statisticians, emphasizing hypothesis testing via likelihood ratio tests and the properties of power functions: Admissibility, unbiasedness and monotonicity.

== Time series ==
Time Series Analysis Forecasting and Control

Authors: George E.P. Box and Gwilym M. Jenkins
Publication data: Holden-Day, 1970
Description: Systematic approach to ARIMA and ARMAX modelling
Importance: This book introduces ARIMA and associated input-output models, studies how to fit them and develops a methodology for time series forecasting and control. It has changed econometrics, process control and forecasting.

== Applied statistics ==
Statistical Methods for Research Workers

Author: R.A. Fisher
Publication data: Edinburgh: Oliver & Boyd, 1925 (1st edition); London: Macmillan, 1970 (15th edition)
Online version: http://psychclassics.yorku.ca/Fisher/Methods/
Description: The original manual for researchers, especially biologists, on how to statistically evaluate numerical data.
Importance: Hugely influential text by the father of modern statistics that remained in print for more than 50 years. Responsible for the widespread use of tests of statistical significance.

Statistical Methods

Author: George W. Snedecor
Publication data: 1937, Collegiate Press
Description: One of the first comprehensive texts on statistical methods. Reissued as Statistical Methods Applied to Experiments in Agriculture and Biology in 1940 and then again as Statistical Methods with Cochran, WG in 1967. A classic text.
Importance: Influence

Principles and Procedures of Statistics with Special Reference to the Biological Sciences.

Authors: Steel, R.G.D, and Torrie, J. H.
Publication data: McGraw Hill (1960) 481 pages
Description: Excellent introductory text for analysis of variance (one-way, multi-way, factorial, split-plot, and unbalanced designs). Also analysis of co-variance, multiple and partial regression and correlation, non-linear regression, and non-parametric analyses. This book was written before computer programmes were available, so it gives the detail needed to make the calculations manually.Cited in more than 1,381 publications between 1961 and 1975.
Importance: Influence

Biometry: The Principles and Practices of Statistics in Biological Research

Authors: Robert R. Sokal; F. J. Rohlf
Publication data: 1st ed. W. H. Freemann (1969); 2nd ed. W. H. Freemann (1981); 3rd ed. Freeman & Co. (1994)
Description:: Key textbook on Biometry: the application of statistical methods for descriptive, experimental, and analytical study of biological phenomena.
Importance Cited in more than 7,000 publications.

== Statistical learning theory ==
On the uniform convergence of relative frequencies of events to their probabilities

Authors: V. Vapnik, A. Chervonenkis
Publication data: Theory of Probability and Its Applications, 16(2):264–280, 1971 doi:10.1137/1116025
Description: Computational learning theory, VC theory, statistical uniform convergence and the VC dimension.
Importance: Breakthrough, Influence

== Variance component estimation ==
On the mathematical foundations of theoretical statistics

Author: Fisher, RA
Publication data: 1922, Philosophical Transactions of the Royal Society of London, Series A, volume 222, pages 309–368
Description: First comprehensive treatise of estimation by maximum likelihood.
Importance: Topic creator, Breakthrough, Influence

Estimation of variance and covariance components

Author: Henderson, CR
Publication data: 1953, Biometrics, volume 9, pages 226–252
Description: First description of three methods of estimation of variance components in mixed linear models for unbalanced data. "One of the most frequently cited papers in the scientific literature."
Importance: Topic creator, Breakthrough, Influence

Maximum-likelihood estimation for the mixed analysis of variance model

Author: H. O. Hartley and J. N. K. Rao
Publication data: 1967, Biometrika, volume 54, pages 93-108 doi:10.1093/biomet/54.1-2.93
Description: First description of maximum likelihood methods for variance component estimation in mixed models
Importance: Topic creator, Breakthrough, Influence

Recovery of inter-block information when block sizes are unequal

Author: Patterson, HD; Thompson, R
Publication data: 1971, Biometrika, volume 58, pages 545-554 doi:10.1093/biomet/58.3.545
Description: First description of restricted maximum likelihood (REML)
Importance: Topic creator, Breakthrough, Influence

Estimation of Variance and Covariance Components in Linear Models

Author: Rao, CR
Publication data: 1972, Journal of the American Statistical Association, volume 67, pages. 112–115
Description: First description of Minimum Variance Quadratic Unbiased Estimation (MIVQUE) and Minimum Norm Quadratic Unbiased Estimation (MINQUE) for unbalanced data
Importance: Topic creator, Breakthrough, Influence

== Survival analysis ==
Nonparametric estimation from incomplete observations

Author: Kaplan, EL and Meier, P
Publication data: 1958, Journal of the American Statistical Association, volume 53, pages 457–481. JSTOR 2281868
Description: First description of the now ubiquitous Kaplan-Meier estimator of survival functions from data with censored observations
Importance: Breakthrough, Influence

A generalized Wilcoxon test for comparing arbitrarily singly-censored samples

Author: Gehan, EA
Publication data: 1965, Biometrika, volume 52, pages 203–223. doi:10.1093/biomet/52.1-2.203
Description: First presentation of the extension of the Wilcoxon rank-sum test to censored data
Importance: Influence

Evaluation of survival data and two new rank order statistics arising in its consideration

Author: Mantel, N
Publication data: 1966, Cancer Chemotherapy Reports, volume 50, pages 163–170. PMID 5910392
Description: Development of the logrank test for censored survival data.
Importance: Topic creator, Breakthrough, Influence

Regression Models and Life Tables

Author: Cox, DR
Publication data: 1972, Journal of the Royal Statistical Society, Series B, volume 34, pages 187–220. JSTOR 2985181
Description: Seminal paper introducing semi-parametric proportional hazards models (Cox models) for survival data
Importance: Topic creator, Breakthrough, Influence

The Statistical Analysis of Failure Time Data

Author: Kalbfleisch, JD and Prentice, RL
Publication data: 1980, John Wiley & Sons, New York
Description: First comprehensive text covering the methods of estimation and inference for time to event analyses
Importance: Influence

== Meta analysis ==
Report on Certain Enteric Fever Inoculation Statistics

Author: Pearson, K
Publication data: 1904, British Medical Journal, volume 2, pages 1243-1246 PMID 20761760
Description: Generally considered to be the first synthesis of results from separate studies, although no formal statistical methods for combining results are presented.
Importance: Breakthrough, Influence

The Probability Integral Transformation for Testing Goodness of Fit and Combining Independent Tests of Significance

Author: Pearson, ES
Publication data: 1938 Biometrika, volume 30, pages 134-148 doi:10.1093/biomet/30.1-2.134
Description: One of the first published methods for formally combining results from different experiments
Importance: Breakthrough, Influence

Combining Independent Tests of Significance

Author: Fisher, RA
Publication data: 1948, The American Statistician, volume 2, page 30
Description: One of the first published methods for formally combining results from different experiments
Importance: Breakthrough, Influence

The combination of estimates from different experiments

Author: Cochran, WG
Publication data: 1954, Biometrics, volume 10, page 101–129
Description: A comprehensive treatment of the various methods for formally combining results from different experiments
Importance: Breakthrough, Influence

== Experimental design ==
On Small Differences in Sensation

Author: Charles Sanders Peirce and Joseph Jastrow
Publication data: Peirce, Charles Sanders; Jastrow, Joseph (1885). "On Small Differences in Sensation". Memoirs of the National Academy of Sciences. 3: 73–83.
Online version: http://psychclassics.yorku.ca/Peirce/small-diffs.htm
Description: Peirce and Jastrow use logistic regression to estimate subjective probabilities of subjects's judgments of the heavier of two measurements, following a randomized controlled repeated measures design.
Importance: The first randomized experiment, which also used blinding; it seems also to have been the first experiment for estimating subjective probabilities.

The Design of Experiments

Author: Fisher, RA
Publication data: 1935, Oliver and Boyd, Edinburgh
Description: The first textbook on experimental design
Importance: Influence

The Design and Analysis of Experiments

Author: Oscar Kempthorne
Publication data: 1950, John Wiley & Sons, New York (Reprinted with corrections in 1979 by Robert E. Krieger)
Description: Early exposition of the general linear model using matrix algebra (following lecture notes of George W. Brown). Bases inference on the randomization distribution objectively defined by the experimental protocol, rather than a so-called "statistical model" expressing the subjective beliefs of a statistician: The normal model is regarded as a convenient approximation to the randomization-distribution, whose quality is assessed by theorems about moments and simulation experiments.
Importance: The first and most extensive discussion of randomation-based inference in the field of design of experiments until the recent 2-volume work by Hinkelmann and Kempthorne; randomization-based inference is called "design-based" inference in survey sampling of finite populations. Introduced the treatment-unit additivity hypothesis, which was discussed in chapter 2 of David R. Cox's book on experiments (1958) and which has influenced Donald Rubin and Paul Rosenbaum's analysis of observational data.

On the Experimental Attainment of Optimum Conditions (with discussion)

Author: George E. P. Box and K. B. Wilson.
Publication data: (1951) Journal of the Royal Statistical Society Series B 13(1):1–45.
Description: Introduced Box-Wilson central composite design for fitting a quadratic polynomial in several variables to experimental data, when an initial affine model had failed to yield a direction of ascent. The design and analysis is motivated by a problem in chemical engineering.
Importance: Introduced response surface methodology for approximating local optima of systems with noisy observations of responses.

== See also ==
- List of scientific journals in statistics
- List of publications in mathematics
- List of publications in data science
