= Probability axioms =

Foundations of probability theory

The standard probability axioms are the foundations of probability theory introduced by Russian mathematician Andrey Kolmogorov in 1933. Like all axiomatic systems, they outline the basic assumptions underlying the application of probability to fields such as pure mathematics and the physical sciences, while avoiding logical paradoxes.

The probability axioms do not specify or assume any particular interpretation of probability, but may be motivated by starting from a philosophical definition of probability and arguing that the axioms are satisfied by this definition. For example,

- Cox's theorem derives the laws of probability based on a "logical" definition of probability as the likelihood or credibility of arbitrary logical propositions.
- The Dutch book arguments show that rational agents must make bets which are in proportion with a subjective measure of the probability of events.

The third axiom, σ-additivity, is relatively modern, and originates with Lebesgue's measure theory. Some authors replace this with the strictly weaker axiom of finite additivity, which is sufficient to deal with some applications.

== Kolmogorov axioms ==
In order to state the Kolmogorov axioms, the following pieces of data must be specified:

- The sample space, $\Omega$, which is the set whose members comprise all possible outcomes or elementary events.
- The space of all events, each of which is some set of outcomes (i.e., some subset of $\Omega$). The event space, $F$, must be a σ-algebra on $\Omega$.
- The probability measure $P$ which assigns to each event $E \in F$ its probability, $P(E)$.

Taken together, these assumptions mean that $(\Omega, F, P)$ is a measure space. It is additionally assumed that $P(\Omega)=1$, making this triple a probability space.

=== First axiom ===
The probability of an event is a non-negative real number. This assumption is implied by the fact that $P$ is a measure on $F$.

$$P(E)\geq 0 \qquad \forall E \in F$$

Theories which assign negative probability relax the first axiom.

=== Second axiom ===
This is the assumption of unit measure: that the probability that one of the elementary events in the entire sample space will occur is 1.
$$P(\Omega) = 1$$
From this axiom it follows that $P(E)$ is always finite, in contrast with more general measure theory.

=== Third axiom ===
This is the assumption of σ-additivity: Any countable sequence of disjoint events (synonymous with mutually exclusive events) $E_1, E_2, \ldots$ satisfies

$$P\left(\bigcup_{i = 1}^\infty E_i\right) = \sum_{i=1}^\infty P(E_i).$$

This property again is implied by the fact that $P$ is a measure. Note that, by taking $E_1 = \Omega$ and $E_i = \emptyset$ for all $i>1$, one deduces that $P(\emptyset) = 0$. This in turn shows that σ-additivity implies finite additivity.

Some authors consider merely finitely additive probability spaces, in which case one just needs an algebra of sets, rather than a σ-algebra. Quasiprobability distributions in general relax the third axiom.

== Elementary consequences ==
In order to demonstrate that the theory generated by the Kolmogorov axioms corresponds with classical probability, some elementary consequences are typically derived.

- Since $P$ is finitely additive, we have $P(A) + P(A^c) = P(A\cup A^c)= P(\Omega) = 1$, so $P(A^c) = 1-P(A)$.
- In particular, it follows that $P(\emptyset) = 0$. The empty set is interpreted as the event that "no outcome occurs", which is impossible.
- Similarly, if $A \subseteq B$, then $P(B) = P(A \cup (B\setminus A)) = P(A) + P(B\setminus A) \ge P(A)$. In other words, $P$ is monotone.
- Since $\emptyset \subseteq E \subseteq \Omega$ for any event $E$, it follows that $0 \le P(E) \le 1$.

By dividing $A \cup B$ into the disjoint sets $A \setminus (A \cap B)$, $B \setminus (A \cap B)$ and $A \cap B$, one arrives at a probabilistic version of the inclusion-exclusion principle
$$P(A \cup B) = P(A) + P(B) - P(A \cap B).$$
In the case where $\Omega$ is finite, the two identities are equivalent.

In order to actually do calculations when $\Omega$ is an infinite set, it is sometimes useful to generalize from a finite sample space. For example, if $\Omega$ consists of all infinite sequences of tosses of a fair coin, it is not obvious how to compute the probability of any particular set of sequences (i.e. an event). If the event is "every flip is heads", then it is intuitive that the probability can be computed as:
$$P(\text{infinite sequence of heads}) = \lim_{n \to \infty} P(\text{sequence of n heads}) = \lim_{n \to \infty} 2^{-n} = 0.$$
In order to make this rigorous, one has to prove that $P$ is continuous, in the following sense. If $A_j,\,\, j = 1, 2, \ldots$ is a sequence of events increasing (or decreasing) to another event $A$, then
$$\lim_{n \to \infty} P(A_n) = P(A).$$

== Simple example: Coin toss ==
Consider a single coin-toss, and assume that the coin will either land heads (H) or tails (T) (but not both). No assumption is made as to whether the coin is fair.

We may define:

$$\Omega = \{H,T\}$$
$$F = \{\varnothing, \{H\}, \{T\}, \{H,T\}\}$$

Kolmogorov's axioms imply that:

$$P(\varnothing) = 0$$

The probability of neither heads nor tails is 0.

$$P(\{H,T\}^c) = 0$$

The probability of either heads or tails is 1.

$$P(\{H\}) + P(\{T\}) = 1$$

The sum of the probability of heads and the probability of tails, is 1.

== See also ==
- Borel algebra – Class of mathematical sets
- Conditional probability – Probability of an event occurring, given that another event has already occurred
- Fully probabilistic design
- Intuitive statistics
- Quasiprobability – Concept in statistics
- Set theory – Branch of mathematics that studies sets
- σ-algebra – Algebraic structure of set algebra
