= Dutch book arguments =

Thought experiment, to justify Bayesian probability

In decision theory, economics, and probability theory, the Dutch book arguments are a set of results showing that agents must satisfy the axioms of rational choice to avoid a kind of self-contradiction called a Dutch book. A Dutch book, sometimes also called a money pump, is a set of bets that ensures a guaranteed loss, i.e., the gambler will lose money no matter what happens. A set of bets is called coherent if it cannot result in a Dutch book.

The Dutch book arguments are used to explore degrees of certainty in beliefs, and demonstrate that rational bet-setters must be Bayesian; in other words, a rational bet-setter must assign event probabilities that behave according to the axioms of probability, and must have preferences that can be modeled using the von Neumann–Morgenstern axioms.

In economics, they are used to model behavior by ruling out situations where agents "burn money" for no real reward. Models based on the assumption that actors are rational are called rational choice models. That assumption is weakened in behavioral models of decision-making.

The thought experiment was first proposed by the Italian probabilist Bruno de Finetti and the English polymath Frank P. Ramsey, apparently independently, in order to justify Bayesian probability. It was more thoroughly explored by Leonard Savage, who developed it into a full model of rational choice.

== Operational subjective probabilities as wagering odds ==
Assume we have two players, A and B. Player A must set the price of a promise to pay $1 if John Smith wins tomorrow's election. Player B will be able to choose either to buy the promise from A at the price A has set, or to require A to buy the promise, still at the same price. In other words: Player A sets the odds, but Player B decides which side of the bet to take. The price A sets is called the "operational subjective probability".

If player A decides that John Smith is 12.5% likely to win, they might then set an odds of 7:1 against. This arbitrary valuation—the "operational subjective probability"—determines the payoff of a successful wager. $1 wagered at these odds will produce either a loss of $1 (if Smith loses) or a win of $7 (if Smith wins). In this example the $1 will also be returned to the bettor in the event of success (otherwise the gain would be $6 and not $7).

== The arguments ==
The standard Dutch book argument concludes that rational agents must have subjective probabilities for random events, and that these probabilities must satisfy the standard axioms of probability. In other words, any rational person must be willing to assign a (quantitative) subjective probability to different events.

Note that the argument does not imply agents are willing to engage in gambling in the traditional sense. The word "bet" as used here refers to any kind of decision under uncertainty. For example, buying an unfamiliar good at a supermarket is a kind of "bet" (the buyer "bets" that the product is good), as is getting into a car ("betting" that the driver will not be involved in an accident).

=== Establishing willingness to bet ===
The Dutch book argument can be reversed by considering the perspective of the bookmaker. In this case, the Dutch book arguments show that any rational agent must be willing to accept some kinds of risks, i.e., to make uncertain bets, or else they will sometimes refuse "free gifts" or "Czech books", a series of bets leaving them better-off with 100% certainty.

=== Unitarity ===
In this example, a punter is offered some odds on mutually exclusive and collectively exhaustive outcomes (meaning that it is always the case that at least one and no more than one outcome occurs). For example this could model betting on a horse race.

The punter decides to bet a total of $210 (sum of the "bet price" column), but the payout is $200 in any case; clearly this includes returning back the winning stake. The punter always makes a loss of $10.

Horse number	Offered odds	Implied probability	Bet price	Payout if horse wins
1	Even	$\frac{1}{1+1} = 0.5$	$100	$100 stake + $100
2	3 to 1 against	$\frac{1}{3+1} = 0.25$	$50	$50 stake + $150
3	4 to 1 against	$\frac{1}{4+1} = 0.2$	$40	$40 stake + $160
4	9 to 1 against	$\frac{1}{9+1} = 0.1$	$20	$20 stake + $180
		Total: 1.05	Total: $210	Always: $200

Note that the probabilities of each horse winning must add up to exactly 1; however the probabilities implied by the offered odds add up to a number greater than 1, which violates the axiom of unitarity.

If horse 4 is withdrawn and the bookmaker does not adjust the other odds, the implied probabilities add up to 0.95. In that case, the punter can always get a profit of $10 by betting the same amounts as before, except for the $20 on the withdrawn horse, which now cannot win. The paid sum is $190 and the payout is always $200.

=== Other axioms ===
Other forms of Dutch books can be used to establish the other axioms of probability, sometimes involving more complex bets like forecasting the order in which horses will finish. In Bayesian probability, Frank P. Ramsey and Bruno de Finetti required personal degrees of belief to be coherent so that a Dutch book could not be made against them, whichever way bets were made. Necessary and sufficient conditions for this are that their degrees of belief satisfy all the axioms of probability.

== Dutch books ==
A person who has set prices on an array of wagers in such a way that they will make a net gain regardless of the outcome is said to have made a Dutch book. When one has a Dutch book, one's opponent always loses. A person who sets prices in a way that gives their opponent a Dutch book is not behaving rationally.

=== A very trivial Dutch book ===
The rules do not forbid a set price higher than $1, but a prudent opponent may sell one a high-priced ticket, such that the opponent comes out ahead regardless of the outcome of the event on which the bet is made. The rules also do not forbid a negative price, but an opponent may extract a paid promise from the bettor to pay him or her later should a certain contingency arise. In either case, the price-setter loses. These lose-lose situations parallel the fact that a probability can neither exceed 1 (certainty) nor be less than 0 (no chance of winning).

=== A more instructive Dutch book ===
Now suppose one sets the price of a promise to pay $1 if the Boston Red Sox win next year's World Series, and also the price of a promise to pay $1 if the New York Yankees win, and finally the price of a promise to pay $1 if either the Red Sox or the Yankees win. One may set the prices in such a way that

$$\text{Price}(\text{Red Sox})+\text{Price}(\text{Yankees})\neq\text{Price}(\text{Red Sox or Yankees}).$$

But if one sets the price of the third ticket lower than the sum of the first two tickets, a prudent opponent will buy that ticket and sell the other two tickets to the price-setter. By considering the three possible outcomes (Red Sox, Yankees, some other team), one will note that regardless of which of the three outcomes eventuates, one will lose. An analogous fate awaits if one sets the price of the third ticket higher than the sum of the other two prices. This parallels the fact that probabilities of mutually exclusive events are additive (see probability axioms).

== Conditional wagers and conditional probabilities ==
Now imagine a more complicated scenario. One must set the prices of three promises:

- to pay $1 if the Red Sox win tomorrow's game: the purchaser of this promise loses their bet if the Red Sox do not win regardless of whether their failure is due to their loss of a completed game or cancellation of the game, and
- to pay $1 if the Red Sox win, and to refund the price of the promise if the game is cancelled, and
- to pay $1 if the game is completed, regardless of who wins.

Three outcomes are possible: The game is cancelled; the game is played and the Red Sox lose; the game is played and the Red Sox win. One may set the prices in such a way that

$$\text{Price}(\text{completed game})\times\text{Price}(\text{Red Sox win}\mid\text{completed game}) \neq \text{Price}(\text{Red Sox win and completed game})$$

(where the second price above is that of the bet that includes the refund in case of cancellation). (Note: The prices here are the dimensionless numbers obtained by dividing by $1, which is the payout in all three cases.) A prudent opponent writes three linear inequalities in three variables. The variables are the amounts they will invest in each of the three promises; the value of one of these is negative if they will make the price-setter buy that promise and positive if they will buy it. Each inequality corresponds to one of the three possible outcomes. Each inequality states that your opponent's net gain is more than zero. A solution exists if the determinant of the matrix is not zero. That determinant is:

$$\text{Price}(\text{completed game})\times\text{Price}(\text{Red Sox win}\mid\text{completed game})-\text{Price}(\text{Red Sox win and completed game}).$$

Thus, a prudent opponent can make the price setter a sure loser unless one sets one's prices in a way that parallels the simplest conventional characterization of conditional probability.

== Another example ==
In the 2015 running of the Kentucky Derby, the favorite ("American Pharaoh") was set ante-post at 5:2, the second favorite at 3:1, and the third favorite at 8:1. All other horses had odds against of 12:1 or higher. With these odds, a wager of $10 on each of all 18 starters would result in a net loss if either the favorite or the second favorite were to win.

However, if one assumes that no horse quoted 12:1 or higher will win, and one bets $10 on each of the top three, one is guaranteed at least a small win. The favorite (who did win) would result in a payout of $25, plus the returned $10 wager, giving an ending balance of $35 (a $5 net increase). A win by the second favorite would produce a payoff of $30 plus the original $10 wager, for a net $10 increase. A win by the third favorite gives $80 plus the original $10, for a net increase of $60.

This sort of strategy, so far as it concerns just the top three, forms a Dutch Book. However, if one considers all eighteen contenders, then no Dutch Book exists for this race.

== Economics ==
In economics, the classic example of a situation in which a consumer can be Dutch-booked is if they have intransitive preferences. Classical economic theory assumes that preferences are transitive: if someone thinks A is better than B and B is better than C, then they must think A is better than C. Moreover, there cannot be any "cycles" of preferences.

The money pump argument notes that if someone held a set of intransitive preferences, they could be exploited (pumped) for money until being forced to exit the market. Imagine Jane has $20 to buy fruit. She can fill her basket with either oranges or apples. Jane would prefer to have a dollar rather than an apple, an apple rather than an orange, and an orange rather than a dollar. Because Jane would rather have an orange than a dollar, she is willing to buy an orange for just over a dollar (perhaps $1.10). Then, she trades her orange for an apple, because she would rather have an apple than an orange. Finally, she sells her apple for a dollar, because she would rather have a dollar than an apple. At this point, Jane is left with $19.90, and has lost 10¢ and gained nothing in return. This process can be repeated until Jane is left with no money. (Note that, if Jane truly holds these preferences, she would see nothing wrong with this process; at every step, Jane agrees she has been left better off.) After running out of money, Jane must exit the market, and her preferences and actions cease to be economically relevant.

Experiments in behavioral economics show that subjects can violate the requirement for transitive preferences when comparing bets. However, most subjects do not make these choices in within-subject comparisons where the contradiction is made obviously visible (in other words, the subjects do not hold genuinely intransitive preferences, but instead make mistakes when making choices using heuristics).

Economists usually argue that people with preferences like Jane's will have all their wealth taken from them in the market. If this is the case, we won't observe preferences with intransitivities or other features that allow people to be Dutch-booked. However, if people are somewhat sophisticated about their intransitivities and/or if competition by arbitrageurs drives epsilon to zero, non-"standard" preferences may still be observable.

== Coherence ==
It can be shown that the set of prices is coherent when they satisfy the probability axioms and related results such as the inclusion–exclusion principle.

== Philosophy ==
Dutch book arguments can be applied to thought experiments in probability theory such as the sleeping beauty problem. Philosophers such as Christopher Hitchcock have argued that Sleeping Beauty is subject to Dutch books if she assigns a credence of 1/2. It has been argued that halfers can avoid Dutch books by adopting evidential decision theory. However, Vincent Conitzer argues that halfers are still affected by Dutch books even after adopting evidential decision theory.

== See also ==
- Arbitrage
- Arbitrage betting
- Bayesian epistemology
- Decision theory
- Rational choice theory
- Mathematics of bookmaking
- Von Neumann-Morgenstern utility theorem
- Scoring rule
