= Unit measure =

Axiom of probability theory

Unit measure is an axiom of probability theory that states that the probability of the entire sample space is equal to one (unity); that is, P(S)=1 where S is the sample space. Loosely speaking, it means that S must be chosen so that when the experiment is performed, something happens. The term measure here refers to the measure-theoretic approach to probability.

Violations of unit measure have been reported in arguments about the outcomes of events under which events acquire "probabilities" that are not the probabilities of probability theory. In situations such as these the term "probability" serves as a false premise to the associated argument.

== See also ==
- Overround, the amount by which the sum of the implied probabilities of a book exceeds 100%
