= Almost (disambiguation) =

Almost is a term in mathematics (especially in set theory) used to mean all the elements except for finitely many.

Almost may also refer to:

== Songs ==
- "Almost" (Bowling for Soup song), 2005
- "Almost", by DNCE from DNCE, 2016
- "Almost" (George Morgan song), 1952
- "Almost (Sweet Music)", by Hozier, 2019
- "Almost", by Jewel from Freewheelin' Woman, 2022
- "Almost", by Mercy Creek, 1999
- "Almost", by Orchestral Manoeuvres in the Dark from Orchestral Manoeuvres in the Dark, 1980
- "Almost", by Sarah Close, 2019
- "Almost", by Sarah Harmer from All of Our Names, 2004
- "Almost", by Soraya, a B-side of the single "Casi", 2003
- "Almost", by the Staple Singers from The Staple Swingers, 1971
- "Almost" (Tamia song), 2007
- "Almost", by Thomas Rhett from Center Point Road, 2019
- "Almost", by Tracy Chapman from Let It Rain, 2002

== Other uses ==
- The Almost, an American Christian rock band
- Almost Skateboards, an American skateboard company

== See also ==
- Approximation
