= Bierlein's measure extension theorem =

Bierlein's measure extension theorem is a result from measure theory and probability theory on extensions of probability measures. The theorem makes a statement about when one can extend a probability measure to a larger σ-algebra. It is of particular interest for infinite dimensional spaces.

The theorem is named after the German mathematician Dietrich Bierlein, who proved the statement for countable families in 1962. The general case was shown by Albert Ascherl and Jürgen Lehn in 1977.

== A measure extension theorem of Bierlein ==
Let $(X,\mathcal{A},\mu)$ be a probability space and $\mathcal{S}\subset \mathcal{P}(X)$ be a σ-algebra, then in general $\mu$ can not be extended to $\sigma(\mathcal{A}\cup \mathcal{S})$. For instance when $\mathcal{S}$ is countably infinite, this is not always possible. Bierlein's extension theorem says, that it is always possible for disjoint families.

=== Statement of the theorem ===
Bierlein's measure extension theorem is

Let $(X,\mathcal{A},\mu)$ be a probability space, $I$ an arbitrary index set and $(A_i)_{i\in I}$ a family of disjoint sets from $X$. Then there exists a extension $\nu$ of $\mu$ on $\sigma(\mathcal{A}\cup\{A_i\colon i\in I\} )$.

=== Related results and generalizations ===
Bierlein gave a result which stated an implication for uniqueness of the extension. Ascherl and Lehn gave a condition for equivalence.

Zbigniew Lipecki proved in 1979 a variant of the statement for group-valued measures (i.e. for "topological hausdorff group"-valued measures).
