= Elementary event =

Event that contains only one outcome

In probability theory, an elementary event, also called an atomic event or sample point, is an event which contains only a single outcome in the sample space. Using set theory terminology, an elementary event is a singleton. Elementary events and their corresponding outcomes are often written interchangeably for simplicity, as such an event corresponding to precisely one outcome.

The following are examples of elementary events:

- All sets $\{ k \},$ where $k \in \N$ if objects are being counted and the sample space is $S = \{ 1, 2, 3, \ldots \}$ (the natural numbers).
- $\{ HH \}, \{ HT \}, \{ TH \}, \text{ and } \{ TT \}$ if a coin is tossed twice. $S = \{ HH, HT, TH, TT \}$ where $H$ stands for heads and $T$ for tails.
- All sets $\{ x \},$ where $x$ is a real number. Here $X$ is a random variable with a normal distribution and $S = (-\infty, + \infty).$ This example shows that, because the probability of each elementary event is zero, the probabilities assigned to elementary events do not determine a continuous probability distribution.

== Probability of an elementary event ==
Elementary events may occur with probabilities that are between zero and one (inclusively). In a discrete probability distribution whose sample space is finite, each elementary event is assigned a particular probability. In contrast, in a continuous distribution, individual elementary events must all have a probability of zero.

Some "mixed" distributions contain both stretches of continuous elementary events and some discrete elementary events; the discrete elementary events in such distributions can be called atoms or atomic events and can have non-zero probabilities.

Under the measure-theoretic definition of a probability space, the probability of an elementary event need not even be defined. In particular, the set of events on which probability is defined may be some σ-algebra on $S$ and not necessarily the full power set.

== See also ==
- Atom (measure theory) – Minimal measurable set with positive measure
- Data point (statistics) – Unit described by the data that one analyzes, in statistics
- Pairwise independent events – Set of random variables of which any two are independent
- Observed value – Observed value of a random variable
