= Almost all =

In mathematics, with negligible exceptions

In mathematics, the term "almost all" means "all but a negligible quantity". More precisely, if $X$ is a set, "almost all elements of $X$" means "all elements of $X$ but those in a negligible subset of $X$". The meaning of "negligible" depends on the mathematical context; for instance, it can mean finite, countable, or null.

In contrast, "almost no" means "a negligible quantity"; that is, "almost no elements of $X$" means "a negligible quantity of elements of $X$".

== Meanings in different areas of mathematics ==
=== Prevalent meaning ===
Throughout mathematics, "almost all" is sometimes used to mean "all (elements of an infinite set) except for finitely many". This use occurs in philosophy as well. Similarly, "almost all" can mean "all (elements of an uncountable set) except for countably many".

Examples:

- Almost all positive integers are greater than 10^{12}.
- Almost all prime numbers are odd (2 is the only exception).
- Almost all polyhedra are irregular (as there are only nine exceptions: the five platonic solids and the four Kepler–Poinsot polyhedra).
- If P is a nonzero polynomial, then P(x) ≠ 0 for almost all x (if not all x).

=== Meaning in measure theory ===
The Cantor function as a function that has zero derivative almost everywhere

When speaking about the reals, sometimes "almost all" can mean "all reals except for a null set". Similarly, if S is some set of reals, "almost all numbers in S" can mean "all numbers in S except for those in a null set". The real line can be thought of as a one-dimensional Euclidean space. In the more general case of an n-dimensional space (where n is a positive integer), these definitions can be generalised to "all points except for those in a null set" or "all points in S except for those in a null set" (this time, S is a set of points in the space). Even more generally, "almost all" is sometimes used in the sense of "almost everywhere" in measure theory, or in the closely related sense of "almost surely" in probability theory.

Examples:

- In a measure space, such as the real line, countable sets are null. The set of rational numbers is countable, so almost all real numbers are irrational.
- Georg Cantor's first set theory article proved that the set of algebraic numbers is countable as well, so almost all reals are transcendental.
- Almost all reals are normal.
- The Cantor set is also null. Thus, almost all reals are not in it even though it is uncountable.
- The derivative of the Cantor function is 0 for almost all numbers in the unit interval. It follows from the previous example because the Cantor function is locally constant, and thus has derivative 0 outside the Cantor set.

=== Meaning in number theory ===
In number theory, "almost all positive integers" can mean "the positive integers in a set whose natural density is 1". That is, if A is a set of positive integers, and if the proportion of positive integers in A below n (out of all positive integers below n) tends to 1 as n tends to infinity, then almost all positive integers are in A. (Note: Weisstein, Eric W. "Almost All". MathWorld. See also Weisstein, Eric W. (25 November 1988). CRC Concise Encyclopedia of Mathematics (1st ed.). CRC Press. p. 41. ISBN 978-0-8493-9640-3.)

More generally, let S be an infinite set of positive integers, such as the set of even positive numbers or the set of primes, if A is a subset of S, and if the proportion of elements of S below n that are in A (out of all elements of S below n) tends to 1 as n tends to infinity, then it can be said that almost all elements of S are in A.

Examples:

- The natural density of cofinite sets of positive integers is 1, so each of them contains almost all positive integers.
- Almost all positive integers are composite. (Note: The prime number theorem shows that the number of primes less than or equal to n is asymptotically equal to n/ln(n). Therefore, the proportion of primes is roughly ln(n)/n, which tends to 0 as n tends to infinity, so the proportion of composite numbers less than or equal to n tends to 1 as n tends to infinity.)
- Almost all even positive numbers can be expressed as the sum of two primes.
- Almost all primes are isolated. Moreover, for every positive integer g, almost all primes have prime gaps of more than g both to their left and to their right; that is, there is no other prime between p − g and p + g.

=== Meaning in graph theory ===
In graph theory, if A is a set of (finite labelled) graphs, it can be said to contain almost all graphs, if the proportion of graphs with n vertices that are in A tends to 1 as n tends to infinity. However, it is sometimes easier to work with probabilities, so the definition is reformulated as follows. The proportion of graphs with n vertices that are in A equals the probability that a random graph with n vertices (chosen with the uniform distribution) is in A, and choosing a graph in this way has the same outcome as generating a graph by flipping a coin for each pair of vertices to decide whether to connect them. Therefore, equivalently to the preceding definition, the set A contains almost all graphs if the probability that a coin-flip–generated graph with n vertices is in A tends to 1 as n tends to infinity. Sometimes, the latter definition is modified so that the graph is chosen randomly in some other way, where not all graphs with n vertices have the same probability, and those modified definitions are not always equivalent to the main one.

The use of the term "almost all" in graph theory is not standard; the term "asymptotically almost surely" is more commonly used for this concept.

Example:

- Almost all graphs are asymmetric.
- Almost all graphs have diameter 2.

=== Meaning in topology ===
In topology and especially dynamical systems theory (including applications in economics), "almost all" of a topological space's points can mean "all of the space's points except for those in a meagre set". Some use a more limited definition, where a subset contains almost all of the space's points only if it contains some open dense set.

Example:

- Given an irreducible algebraic variety, the properties that hold for almost all points in the variety are exactly the generic properties. This is due to the fact that in an irreducible algebraic variety equipped with the Zariski topology, all nonempty open sets are dense.

=== Meaning in algebra ===
In abstract algebra and mathematical logic, if U is an ultrafilter on a set X, "almost all elements of X" sometimes means "the elements of some element of U". For any partition of X into two disjoint sets, one of them will necessarily contain almost all elements of X. It is possible to think of the elements of a filter on X as containing almost all elements of X, even if it isn't an ultrafilter.

== See also ==
- Almost
- Almost everywhere
- Almost surely
