= Fully probabilistic design =

Decision making (DM) can be seen as a purposeful choice of action sequences. It also covers control, a purposeful choice of input sequences. As a rule, it runs under randomness, uncertainty and incomplete knowledge. A range of prescriptive theories have been proposed how to make optimal decisions under these conditions. They optimise sequence of decision rules, mappings of the available knowledge on possible actions. This sequence is called strategy or policy. Among various theories, Bayesian DM is broadly accepted axiomatically based theory that solves the design of optimal decision strategy. It describes random, uncertain or incompletely known quantities as random variables, i.e. by their joint probability expressing belief in their possible values. The strategy that minimises expected loss (or equivalently maximises expected reward) expressing decision-maker's goals is then taken as the optimal strategy. While the probabilistic description of beliefs is uniquely and deductively driven by rules for joint probabilities, the composition and decomposition of the loss function have no such universally applicable formal machinery.

Fully probabilistic design (of decision strategies or control, FPD) removes the mentioned drawback and expresses also the DM goals of by the "ideal" probability, which assigns high (small) values to desired (undesired) behaviours of the closed DM loop formed by the influenced world part and by the used strategy. FPD has axiomatic basis and has Bayesian DM as its restricted subpart. FPD has a range of theoretical consequences , and, importantly, has been successfully used to quite diverse application domains.

== See also ==
- Bayesian probability
- Decision-making
- Axiomatic system
