= Almost =

Term in set theory

In set theory, when dealing with sets of infinite size, the term almost or nearly is used to refer to all but a negligible amount of elements in the set. The notion of "negligible" depends on the context, and may mean "of measure zero" (in a measure space), "finite" (when infinite sets are involved), or "countable" (when uncountably infinite sets are involved).

For example:

- The set $S = \{ n \in \mathbb{N}\,|\, n \ge k \}$ is almost $\mathbb{N}$ for any $k$ in $\mathbb{N}$, because only finitely many natural numbers are less than $k$.
- The set of prime numbers is not almost $\mathbb{N}$, because there are infinitely many natural numbers that are not prime numbers.
- The set of transcendental numbers are almost $\mathbb{R}$, because the algebraic real numbers form a countable subset of the set of real numbers (which is uncountable).
- The Cantor set is uncountably infinite, but has Lebesgue measure zero. So almost all real numbers in (0, 1) are members of the complement of the Cantor set.

== See also ==
- Almost periodic function - and Operators
- Almost all
- Almost surely
- Approximation
- List of mathematical jargon
