= Atom (measure theory) =

Minimal measurable set with positive measure

In mathematics, more precisely in measure theory, an atom is a measurable set that has positive measure and contains no set of smaller positive measures. A measure that has no atoms is called non-atomic or atomless.

== Definition ==
Given a measurable space $(X, \Sigma)$ and a measure $\mu$ on that space, a set $A\subset X$ in $\Sigma$ is called an atom if
$$\mu(A) > 0$$
and for any measurable subset $B \subseteq A$, either $\mu(B) = 0$ or $\mu(B)=\mu(A)$.

The equivalence class of $A$ is defined by
$$[A] := \{B\in \Sigma : \mu(A\Delta B) = 0\},$$
where $\Delta$ is the symmetric difference operator. If $A$ is an atom then all the subsets in $[A]$ are atoms and $[A]$ is called an atomic class. If $\mu$ is a $\sigma$-finite measure, there are countably many atomic classes.

== Examples ==
- Consider the set X = {1, 2, ..., 9, 10} and let the sigma-algebra $\Sigma$ be the power set of X. Define the measure $\mu$ of a set to be its cardinality, that is, the number of elements in the set. Then, each of the singletons {i}, for i = 1, 2, ..., 9, 10 is an atom.
- Consider the Lebesgue measure on the real line. This measure has no atoms.

== Atomic measures ==
A $\sigma$-finite measure $\mu$ on a measurable space $(X, \Sigma)$ is called atomic or purely atomic if every measurable set of positive measure contains an atom. This is equivalent to say that there is a countable partition of $X$ formed by atoms up to a null set. The assumption of $\sigma$-finitude is essential. Consider otherwise the space $(\mathbb{R},\mathcal{P}(\Reals),\nu)$ where $\nu$ denotes the counting measure. This space is atomic, with all atoms being the singletons, yet the space is not able to be partitioned into the disjoint union of countably many disjoint atoms, $\bigcup_{n=1}^\infty A_n$ and a null set $N$ since the countable union of singletons is a countable set, and the uncountability of the real numbers shows that the complement $N = \mathbb{R} \setminus \bigcup_{n=1}^\infty A_n$ would have to be uncountable, hence its $\nu$-measure would be infinite, in contradiction to it being a null set. The validity of the result for $\sigma$-finite spaces follows from the proof for finite measure spaces by observing that the countable union of countable unions is again a countable union, and that the countable unions of null sets are null.

== Discrete measures ==
A $\sigma$-finite atomic measure $\mu$ is called discrete if the intersection of the atoms of any atomic class is non empty. It is equivalent to say that $\mu$ is the weighted sum of countably many Dirac measures, that is, there is a sequence $x_1,x_2,...$ of points in $X$, and a sequence $c_1,c_2,...$ of positive real numbers (the weights) such that $\mu=\sum_{k=1}^\infty c_k\delta_{x_k}$, which means that $\mu(A) = \sum_{k=1}^\infty c_k\delta_{x_k}(A)$ for every $A\in\Sigma$. We can choose each point $x_k$ to be a common point of the atoms in the $k$-th atomic class.

A discrete measure is atomic but the inverse implication fails: take $X=[0,1]$, $\Sigma$ the $\sigma$-algebra of countable and co-countable subsets, $\mu=0$ in countable subsets and $\mu=1$ in co-countable subsets. Then there is a single atomic class, the one formed by the co-countable subsets. The measure $\mu$ is atomic but the intersection of the atoms in the unique atomic class is empty and $\mu$ can't be put as a sum of Dirac measures.

If every atom is equivalent to a singleton, then $\mu$ is discrete iff it is atomic. In this case the $x_k$ above are the atomic singletons, so they are unique. Any finite measure in a separable metric space provided with the Borel sets satisfies this condition.

== Non-atomic measures ==
A measure which has no atoms is called non-atomic measure or a diffuse measure. In other words, a measure $\mu$ is non-atomic if for any measurable set $A$ with $\mu(A) > 0$ there exists a measurable subset $B$ of $A$ such that
$$\mu(A) > \mu (B) > 0.$$

A non-atomic measure with at least one positive value has an infinite number of distinct values, as starting with a set $A$ with $\mu(A) > 0$ one can construct a decreasing sequence of measurable sets
$$A = A_1\supset A_2 \supset A_3 \supset \cdots$$
such that
$$\mu(A) = \mu(A_1) > \mu(A_2) > \mu(A_3) > \cdots > 0.$$

This may not be true for measures having atoms; see the first example above.

It turns out that non-atomic measures actually have a continuum of values. It can be proved that if $\mu$ is a non-atomic measure and $A$ is a measurable set with $\mu(A) > 0,$ then for any real number $b$ satisfying
$$\mu(A) \geq b \geq 0$$
there exists a measurable subset $B$ of $A$ such that
$$\mu(B) = b.$$

This theorem is due to Wacław Sierpiński. It is reminiscent of the intermediate value theorem for continuous functions.

Sketch of proof of Sierpiński's theorem on non-atomic measures. A slightly stronger statement, which however makes the proof easier, is that if $(X, \Sigma, \mu)$ is a non-atomic measure space and $\mu(X) = c,$ there exists a function $S : [0, c] \to \Sigma$ that is monotone with respect to inclusion, and a right-inverse to $\mu : \Sigma \to [0, c].$ That is, there exists a one-parameter family of measurable sets $S(t)$ such that for all $0 \leq t \leq t' \leq c$
$$\begin{align}
S(t) &\subseteq S(t'),\\
\mu\left (S(t)\right)&=t.
\end{align}$$
The proof easily follows from Zorn's lemma applied to the set of all monotone partial sections to $\mu$ :
$$\Gamma: = \{S : D \to \Sigma\; :\; D \subseteq [0, c],\, S\; \mathrm{ monotone }, \text{ for all } t \in D\; (\mu(S(t)) = t)\},$$
ordered by inclusion of graphs, $\mathrm{graph}(S) \subseteq \mathrm{graph}(S').$ It's then standard to show that every chain in $\Gamma$ has an upper bound in $\Gamma,$ and that any maximal element of $\Gamma$ has domain $[0, c],$ proving the claim.

== See also ==
- Atom (order theory) — an analogous concept in order theory
- Dirac delta function
- Elementary event, also known as an atomic event
