= Data analysis =

Data analysis is the process of inspecting, cleansing, transforming, and modeling data with the goal of discovering useful information, informing conclusions, and supporting decision-making. Data analysis has multiple facets and approaches, encompassing diverse techniques under a variety of names, and is used in different business, science, and social science domains. In today's business world, data analysis plays an important role in making decisions more scientific and helping businesses operate more effectively. It is widely used in fields such as business analytics, healthcare, and artificial intelligence to extract meaningful insights from data.

Data mining is a particular data analysis technique that focuses on statistical modeling and knowledge discovery for predictive rather than purely descriptive purposes, while business intelligence covers data analysis that relies heavily on aggregation, focusing mainly on business information. In statistical applications, data analysis can be divided into descriptive statistics, exploratory data analysis (EDA), and confirmatory data analysis (CDA). EDA focuses on discovering new features in the data, while CDA focuses on confirming or falsifying existing hypotheses. Predictive analytics focuses on the application of statistical models for predictive forecasting or classification, while text analytics applies statistical, linguistic, and structural techniques to extract and classify information from textual sources, a variety of unstructured data. All of the above are varieties of data analysis.

== Data analysis process ==
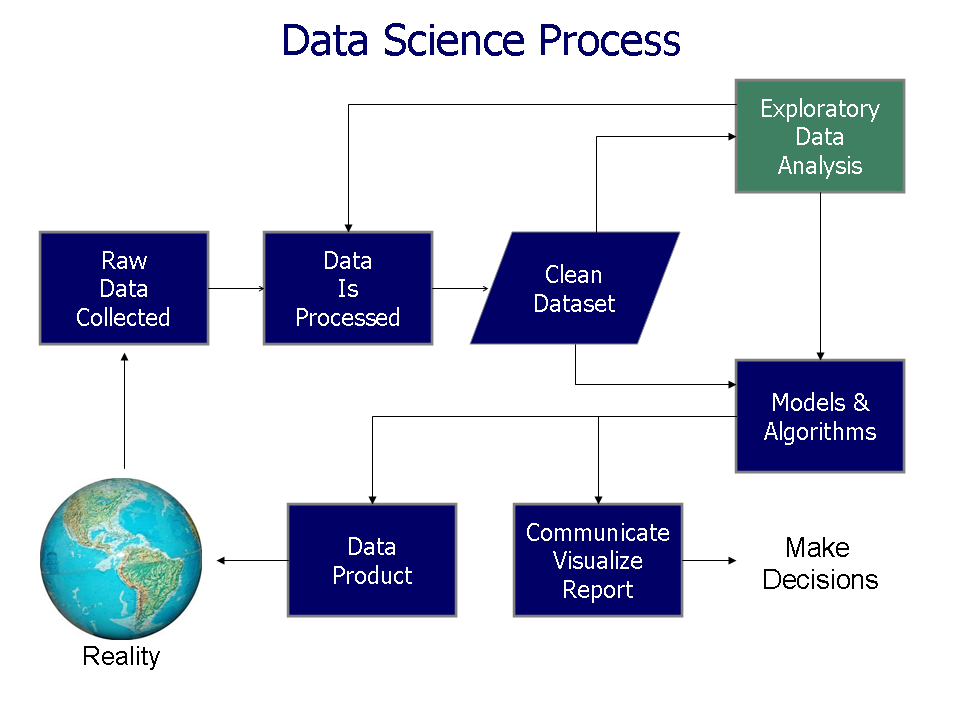
Data science process flowchart from Doing Data Science, by Schutt & O'Neil (2013)

Data analysis is a process for obtaining raw data, and subsequently converting it into information useful for decision-making by users. Statistician John Tukey, defined data analysis in 1961, as:

"Procedures for analyzing data, techniques for interpreting the results of such procedures, ways of planning the gathering of data to make its analysis easier, more precise or more accurate, and all the machinery and results of (mathematical) statistics which apply to analyzing data."

There are several phases, and they are iterative, in that feedback from later phases may result in additional work in earlier phases.

=== Data requirements ===
The data is necessary as inputs to the analysis, which is specified based upon the requirements of those directing the analytics (or customers, who will use the finished product of the analysis). The general type of entity upon which the data will be collected is referred to as an experimental unit (e.g., a person or population of people). Specific variables regarding a population (e.g., age and income) may be specified and obtained. Data may be numerical or categorical (i.e., a text label for numbers).

FRAMEWORK AND TOOLS

A data analysis framework provides a step-by-step methodical approach used to collect, analyse, process and interpret data in large volumes, even for big data analysis. The components of the data analysis framework are the steps the data follows to be finally implemented and used in industries. These components include data collection, data preparation, data analysis, data visualisation, communication of results, decision-making and implementation.

Frameworks such as Flink, Spark, Apache Hadoop, RapidMiner, and Storm can be helpful for data analysis. Here we provide brief descriptions of a few of these frameworks:

1. HADOOP: Hadoop is generally designed for the distributed storage and processing of large datasets across clusters of computers. It is mainly used for batch processing tasks.
2. SPARK: Spark is an open-source distributed computing system which provides an interface for programming entire clusters. It is ultimately known to be more flexible and faster than the hadoop.
3. RapidMiner: RapidMiner provides integrated text mining, data preparation, predictive analytics, machine learning and deep learning.

Data analysis frameworks provide a structured approach to gain valuable insights from data.

Data analysis tools are software aids, programs and applications that help professionals analyse large and small data sets. They can also be seen as a series of diagrams, charts and maps, designed to collect, interpret, arrange and present data for a much broader range of applications and industries. Many more methods have been used in various industries, ranging from quality assurance to manufacturing and data collection companies. Choosing the right data analytics tool is essential to help a professional meet their goal. Several data analysis tools can be used, such as Tableau (a data visualisation tool), SAS, check sheets, box and whisker plots, and histograms, to mention a few. Some tools have different uses, while some tools are used strictly for specific tasks. For instance, Tableau is used for data visualisation and business intelligence; a check sheet is used for a wider range of operations.

WHO USES DATA ANALYSIS FRAMEWORKS AND TOOLS?

These data analysis frameworks and tools are widely used by project managers, data analysts, business analysts, data scientists, and digital marketers.

=== Data collection ===
Data may be collected from a variety of sources and organized into datasets, some of which are openly available. The requirements may be communicated by analysts to custodians of the data; such as, Information Technology personnel within an organization. Data collection or data gathering is the process of gathering and measuring information on targeted variables in an established system, which then enables one to answer relevant questions and evaluate outcomes. The data may also be collected from sensors in the environment, including traffic cameras, satellites, recording devices, etc. It may also be obtained through interviews, downloads from online sources, or reading documentation.

=== Data processing ===
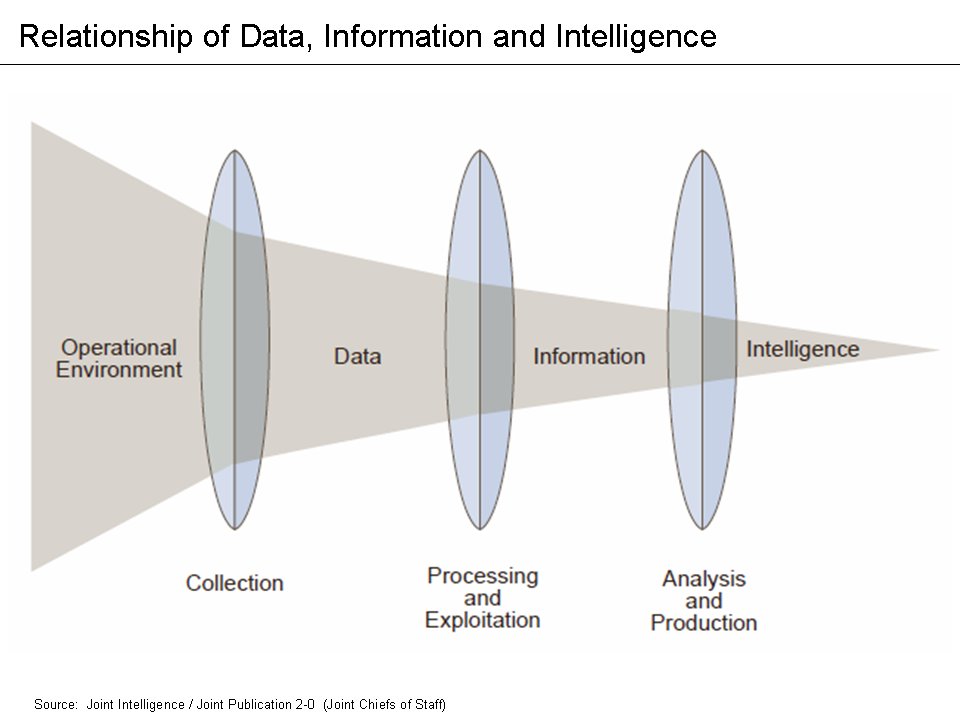
The phases of the intelligence cycle used to convert raw information into actionable intelligence or knowledge are conceptually similar to the phases in data analysis.

Data integration is a precursor to data analysis: Data, when initially obtained, must be processed or organized for analysis. For instance, this may involve placing data into rows and columns in a table format (known as structured data) for further analysis, often through the use of spreadsheet (e.g. Excel) or statistical software.

=== Data cleaning ===
Once processed and organized, the data may be incomplete, contain duplicates, or contain errors. The need for data cleaning will arise from problems in the way that the data is entered and stored. Data cleaning is the process of preventing and correcting these errors. Common tasks include record matching, identifying inaccuracy of data, overall quality of existing data, deduplication, and column segmentation.

Such data problems can also be identified through a variety of analytical techniques. For example; with financial information, the totals for particular variables may be compared against separately published numbers that are believed to be reliable. Unusual amounts, above or below predetermined thresholds, may also be reviewed. There are several types of data cleaning that are dependent upon the type of data in the set; this could be phone numbers, email addresses, employers, or other values. Quantitative data methods for outlier detection can be used to get rid of data that appears to have a higher likelihood of being input incorrectly. Text data spell checkers can be used to lessen the amount of mistyped words. However, it is harder to tell if the words are contextually (i.e., semantically and idiomatically) correct.

=== Exploratory data analysis ===
Once the datasets are cleaned, they can then begin to be analyzed using exploratory data analysis. The process of data exploration may result in additional data cleaning or additional requests for data; thus, the initialization of the iterative phases mentioned above. Descriptive statistics, such as the average, median, and standard deviation, are often used to broadly characterize the data. Data visualization is also used, in which the analyst is able to examine the data in a graphical format in order to obtain additional insights about messages within the data.

=== Data modeling ===
Mathematical formulas or mathematical models (supported by algorithms) may be applied to the data in order to identify relationships among the variables; for example, checking for correlation and by determining whether or not there is the presence of causality. In general terms, models may be developed to evaluate a specific variable based on other variable(s) contained within the dataset, with some residual error depending on the implemented model's accuracy (e.g., Data = Model + Error).

Inferential statistics utilizes techniques that measure the relationships between particular variables. For example, regression analysis may be used to model whether a change in advertising (independent variable X), provides an explanation for the variation in sales (dependent variable Y), i.e. is Y a function of X? This can be described as (Y = aX + b + error), where the model is designed such that (a) and (b) minimize the error when the model predicts Y for a given range of values of X.

=== Data product ===
A data product is a computer application that takes data inputs and generates outputs, feeding them back into the environment. It may be based on a model or algorithm. For instance, an application that analyzes data about customer purchase history, and uses the results to recommend other purchases the customer might enjoy.

=== Communication ===
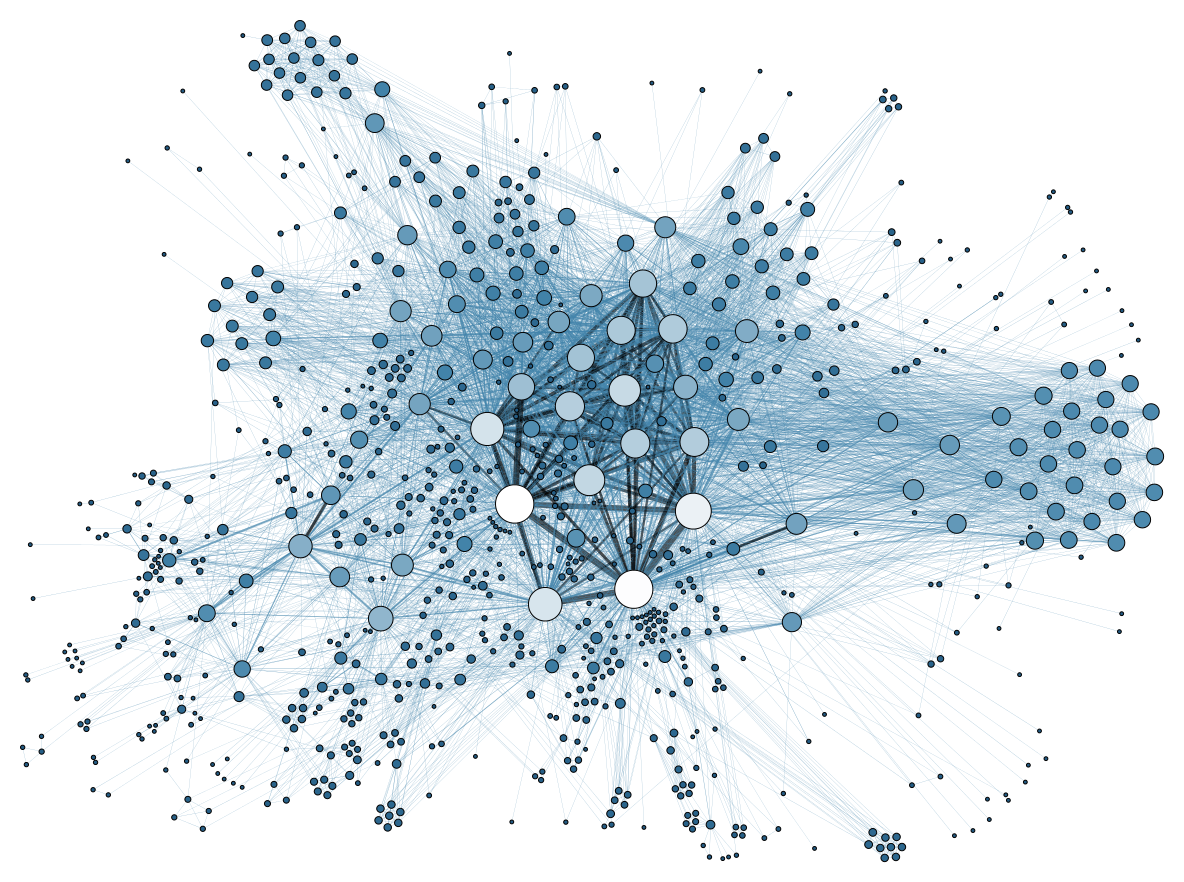
Data visualization is used to help understand the results after data is analyzed.

Once data is analyzed, it may be presented in many formats to the users of the analysis to support their requirements. The users may have feedback, which results in additional analysis.

When determining how to communicate the results, the analyst may consider implementing a variety of data visualization techniques to help communicate the message more clearly and efficiently to the audience. Data visualization uses information displays (graphics such as, tables and charts) to help communicate key messages contained in the data. Tables are a valuable tool by enabling the ability of a user to query and focus on specific numbers; while charts (e.g., bar charts or line charts), may help explain the quantitative messages contained in the data.

== Quantitative messages ==
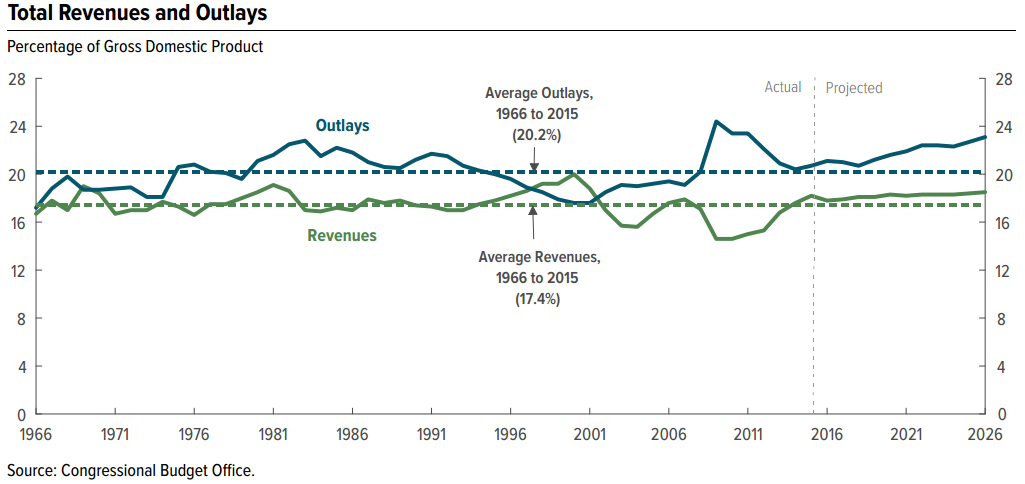
A time series illustrated with a line chart demonstrating trends in U.S. federal spending and revenue over time

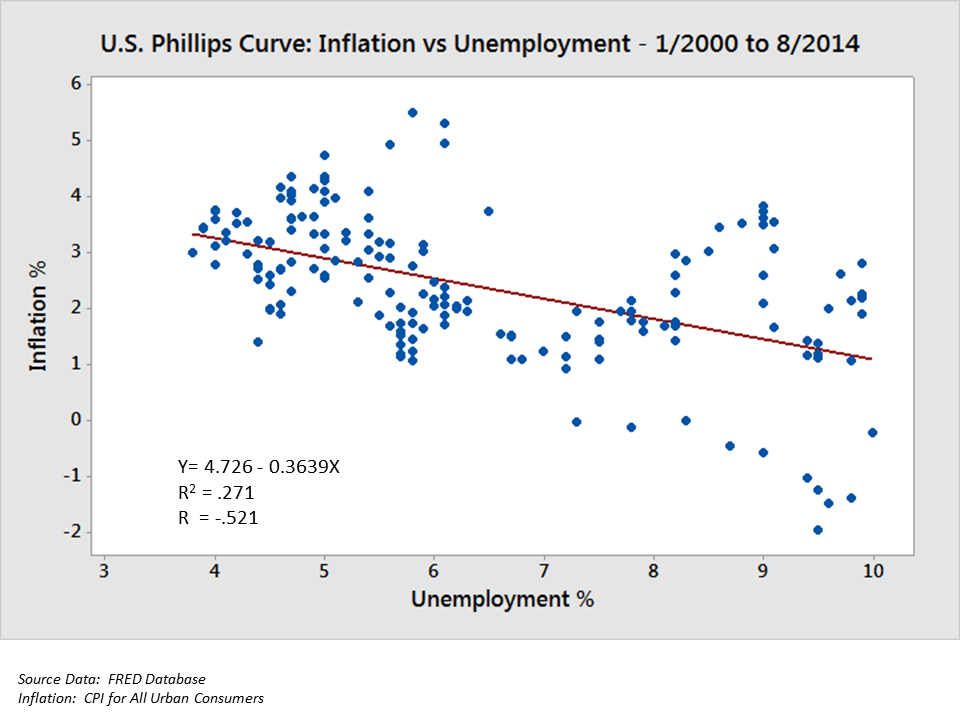
A scatterplot illustrating the correlation between two variables (inflation and unemployment) measured at points in time

Stephen Few described eight types of quantitative messages that users may attempt to communicate from a set of data, including the associated graphs.

1. Time-series: A single variable is captured over a period of time, such as the unemployment rate over a 10-year period. A line chart may be used to demonstrate the trend.
2. Ranking: Categorical subdivisions are ranked in ascending or descending order, such as a ranking of sales performance (the measure) by salespersons (the category, with each salesperson a categorical subdivision) during a single period. A bar chart may be used to show the comparison across the salespersons.
3. Part-to-whole: Categorical subdivisions are measured as a ratio to the whole (i.e., a percentage out of 100%). A pie chart or bar chart can show the comparison of ratios, such as the market share represented by competitors in a market.
4. Deviation: Categorical subdivisions are compared against a reference, such as a comparison of actual vs. budget expenses for several departments of a business for a given time period. A bar chart can show the comparison of the actual versus the reference amount.
5. Frequency distribution: Shows the number of observations of a particular variable for a given interval, such as the number of years in which the stock market return is between intervals such as 0–10%, 11–20%, etc. A histogram, a type of bar chart, may be used for this analysis.
6. Correlation: Comparison between observations represented by two variables (X,Y) to determine if they tend to move in the same or opposite directions. For example, plotting unemployment (X) and inflation (Y) for a sample of months. A scatter plot is typically used for this message.
7. Nominal comparison: Comparing categorical subdivisions in no particular order, such as the sales volume by product code. A bar chart may be used for this comparison.
8. Geographic or geo-spatial: Comparison of a variable across a map or layout, such as the unemployment rate by state or the number of persons on the various floors of a building. A cartogram is typically used.

== Analyzing quantitative data in finance ==
Author Jonathan Koomey has recommended a series of best practices for understanding quantitative data. These include:

- Check raw data for anomalies prior to performing an analysis;
- Re-perform important calculations, such as verifying columns of data that are formula-driven;
- Confirm main totals are the sum of subtotals;
- Check relationships between numbers that should be related in a predictable way, such as ratios over time;
- Normalize numbers to make comparisons easier, such as analyzing amounts per person or relative to GDP or as an index value relative to a base year;
- Break problems into component parts by analyzing factors that led to the results, such as DuPont analysis of return on equity.

For the variables under examination, analysts typically obtain descriptive statistics, such as the mean (average), median, and standard deviation. They may also analyze the distribution of the key variables to see how the individual values cluster around the mean.

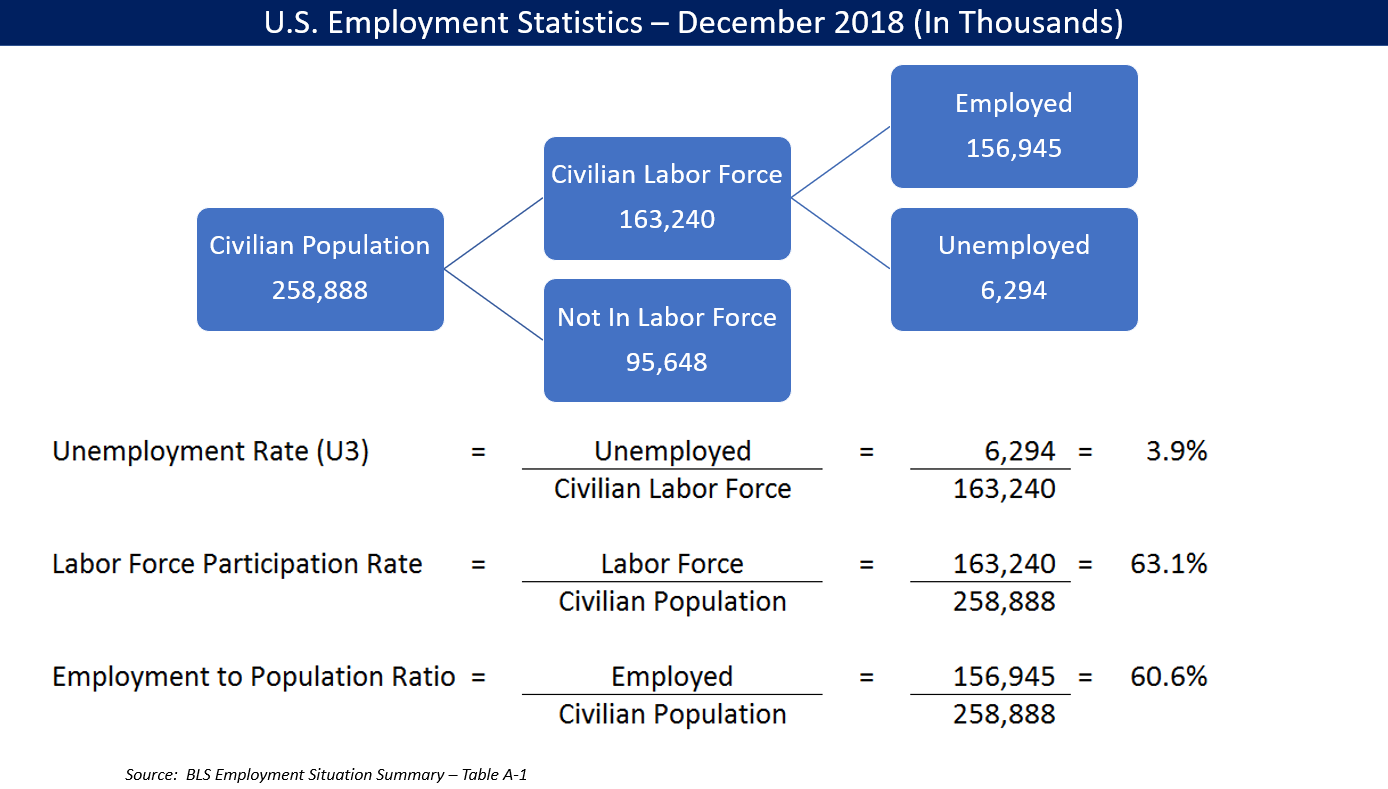
An illustration of the MECE principle used for data analysis

McKinsey and Company named a technique for breaking down a quantitative problem into its component parts called the MECE principle. MECE means "Mutually Exclusive and Collectively Exhaustive". Each layer can be broken down into its components; each of the sub-components must be mutually exclusive of each other and collectively add up to the layer above them. For example, profit by definition can be broken down into total revenue and total cost.

Analysts may use robust statistical measurements to solve certain analytical problems. Hypothesis testing is used when a particular hypothesis about the true state of affairs is made by the analyst and data is gathered to determine whether that hypothesis is true or false. For example, the hypothesis might be that "Unemployment has no effect on inflation", which relates to an economics concept called the Phillips Curve. Hypothesis testing involves considering the likelihood of Type I and type II errors, which relate to whether the data supports accepting or rejecting the hypothesis.

Regression analysis may be used when the analyst is trying to determine the extent to which independent variable X affects dependent variable Y (e.g., "To what extent do changes in the unemployment rate (X) affect the inflation rate (Y)?").

Necessary condition analysis (NCA) may be used when the analyst is trying to determine the extent to which independent variable X allows variable Y (e.g., "To what extent is a certain unemployment rate (X) necessary for a certain inflation rate (Y)?"). Whereas (multiple) regression analysis uses additive logic where each X-variable can produce the outcome and the X's can compensate for each other (they are sufficient but not necessary), necessary condition analysis (NCA) uses necessity logic, where one or more X-variables allow the outcome to exist, but may not produce it (they are necessary but not sufficient). Each single necessary condition must be present and compensation is not possible.

== Analytical activities of data users ==
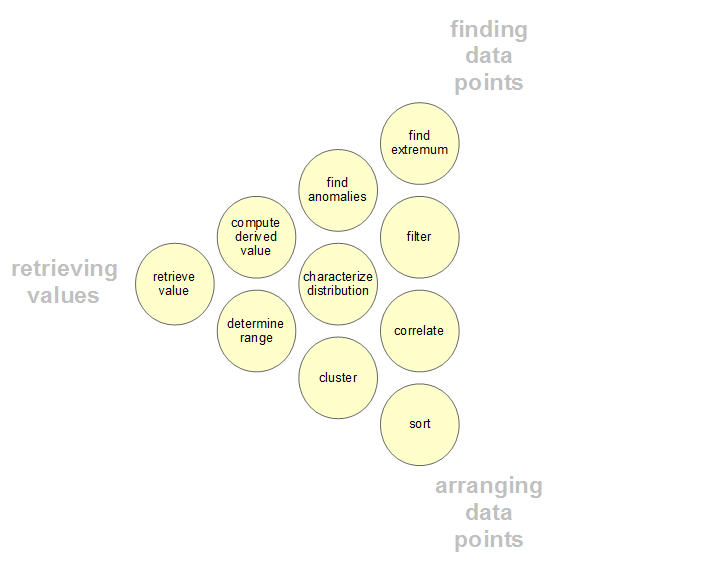
Analytic activities of data visualization users

Users may have particular data points of interest within a data set, as opposed to the general messaging outlined above. Such low-level analytical activities are presented in the following table. The taxonomy can also be organized by three poles of activities: retrieving values, finding data points, and arranging data points.

#	Task	General description	Pro forma abstract	Examples
1	Retrieve Value	Given a set of specific cases, find attributes of those cases.	What are the values of attributes {X, Y, Z, ...} in the data cases {A, B, C, ...}?	What is the mileage per gallon of the Ford Mondeo?; How long is the movie Gone with the Wind?
2	Filter	Given some concrete conditions on attribute values, find data cases satisfying those conditions.	Which data cases satisfy conditions {A, B, C...}?	What Kellogg's cereals have high fiber?; What comedies have won awards?; Which funds underperformed the SP-500?
3	Compute Derived Value	Given a set of data cases, compute an aggregate numeric representation of those data cases.	What is the value of aggregation function F over a given set S of data cases?	What is the average calorie content of Post cereals?; What is the gross income of all stores combined?; How many manufacturers of cars are there?
4	Find Extremum	Find data cases possessing an extreme value of an attribute over its range within the data set.	What are the top/bottom N data cases with respect to attribute A?	What is the car with the highest MPG?; What director/film has won the most awards?; What Marvel Studios film has the most recent release date?
5	Sort	Given a set of data cases, rank them according to some ordinal metric.	What is the sorted order of a set S of data cases according to their value of attribute A?	Order the cars by weight.; Rank the cereals by calories.
6	Determine Range	Given a set of data cases and an attribute of interest, find the span of values within the set.	What is the range of values of attribute A in a set S of data cases?	What is the range of film lengths?; What is the range of car horsepowers?; What actresses are in the data set?
7	Characterize Distribution	Given a set of data cases and a quantitative attribute of interest, characterize the distribution of that attribute's values over the set.	What is the distribution of values of attribute A in a set S of data cases?	What is the distribution of carbohydrates in cereals?; What is the age distribution of shoppers?
8	Find Anomalies	Identify any anomalies within a given set of data cases with respect to a given relationship or expectation, e.g. statistical outliers.	Which data cases in a set S of data cases have unexpected/exceptional values?	Are there exceptions to the relationship between horsepower and acceleration?; Are there any outliers in protein?
9	Cluster	Given a set of data cases, find clusters of similar attribute values.	Which data cases in a set S of data cases are similar in value for attributes {X, Y, Z, ...}?	Are there groups of cereals w/ similar fat/calories/sugar?; Is there a cluster of typical film lengths?
10	Correlate	Given a set of data cases and two attributes, determine useful relationships between the values of those attributes.	What is the correlation between attributes X and Y over a given set S of data cases?	Is there a correlation between carbohydrates and fat?; Is there a correlation between country of origin and MPG?; Do different genders have a preferred payment method?; Is there a trend of increasing film length over the years?
11	Contextualization	Given a set of data cases, find contextual relevancy of the data to the users.	Which data cases in a set S of data cases are relevant to the current users' context?	Are there groups of restaurants that have foods based on my current caloric intake?

== Barriers to effective analysis ==
Barriers to effective analysis may exist among the analysts performing the data analysis or among the audience. Distinguishing fact from opinion, cognitive biases, and innumeracy are all challenges to sound data analysis.

=== Confusing fact and opinion ===
You are entitled to your own opinion, but you are not entitled to your own facts.

— Daniel Patrick Moynihan

Effective analysis requires obtaining relevant facts to answer questions, support a conclusion or formal opinion, or test hypotheses. Facts by definition are irrefutable, meaning that any person involved in the analysis should be able to agree upon them. The auditor of a public company must arrive at a formal opinion on whether financial statements of publicly traded corporations are "fairly stated, in all material respects". This requires extensive analysis of factual data and evidence to support their opinion.

=== Cognitive biases ===
There are a variety of cognitive biases that can adversely affect analysis. For example, confirmation bias is the tendency to search for or interpret information in a way that confirms one's preconceptions. In addition, individuals may discredit information that does not support their views.

Analysts may be trained specifically to be aware of these biases and how to overcome them. In his book Psychology of Intelligence Analysis, retired CIA analyst Richards Heuer wrote that analysts should clearly delineate their assumptions and chains of inference and specify the degree and source of the uncertainty involved in the conclusions. He emphasized procedures to help surface and debate alternative points of view.

=== Innumeracy ===
Effective analysts are generally adept with a variety of numerical techniques. However, audiences may not have such literacy with numbers or numeracy; they are said to be innumerate. Persons communicating the data may also be attempting to mislead or misinform, deliberately using bad numerical techniques.

For example, whether a number is rising or falling may not be the key factor. More important may be the number relative to another number, such as the size of government revenue or spending relative to the size of the economy (GDP) or the amount of cost relative to revenue in corporate financial statements. This numerical technique is referred to as normalization or common-sizing. There are many such techniques employed by analysts, whether adjusting for inflation (i.e., comparing real vs. nominal data) or considering population increases, demographics, etc.

Analysts may also analyze data under different assumptions or scenarios. For example, when analysts perform financial statement analysis, they will often recast the financial statements under different assumptions to help arrive at an estimate of future cash flow, which they then discount to present value based on some interest rate, to determine the valuation of the company or its stock. Similarly, the CBO analyzes the effects of various policy options on the government's revenue, outlays and deficits, creating alternative future scenarios for key measures.

== Other applications ==
=== Analytics and business intelligence ===
Analytics is the "extensive use of data, statistical and quantitative analysis, explanatory and predictive models, and fact-based management to drive decisions and actions." It is a subset of business intelligence, which is a set of technologies and processes that uses data to understand and analyze business performance to drive decision-making.

=== Education ===
In education, most educators have access to a data system for the purpose of analyzing student data. These data systems present data to educators in an over-the-counter data format (embedding labels, supplemental documentation, and a help system and making key package/display and content decisions) to improve the accuracy of educators' data analyses.

=== Public safety ===
Data analysis is also applied to public safety and law enforcement. Colombia's National Police uses the IAPOL system to combine information from crime records, corrective-measure records and emergency-response systems. The system analyzes historical and georeferenced data to generate heat maps that support operational decision-making.

== Practitioner notes ==
This section contains rather technical explanations that may assist practitioners but are beyond the typical scope of a Wikipedia article.

=== Initial data analysis ===
The most important distinction between the initial data analysis phase and the main analysis phase is that during initial data analysis one refrains from any analysis that is aimed at answering the original research question. The initial data analysis phase is guided by the following four questions:

==== Quality of data ====
The quality of the data should be checked as early as possible. Data quality can be assessed in several ways, using different types of analysis: frequency counts, descriptive statistics (mean, standard deviation, median), normality (skewness, kurtosis, frequency histograms), normal imputation is needed.

- Analysis of extreme observations: outlying observations in the data are analyzed to see if they seem to disturb the distribution.
- Comparison and correction of differences in coding schemes: variables are compared with coding schemes of variables external to the data set, and possibly corrected if coding schemes are not comparable.
- Test for common-method variance. The choice of analyses to assess the data quality during the initial data analysis phase depends on the analyses that will be conducted in the main analysis phase.

==== Quality of measurements ====
The quality of the measurement instruments should only be checked during the initial data analysis phase when this is not the focus or research question of the study. One should check whether structure of measurement instruments corresponds to structure reported in the literature.

There are two ways to assess measurement quality:

- Confirmatory factor analysis
- Analysis of homogeneity (internal consistency), which gives an indication of the reliability of a measurement instrument. During this analysis, one inspects the variances of the items and the scales, the Cronbach's α of the scales, and the change in the Cronbach's alpha when an item would be deleted from a scale

==== Initial transformations ====
After assessing the quality of the data and of the measurements, one might decide to impute missing data, or to perform initial transformations of one or more variables, although this can also be done during the main analysis phase.
Possible transformations of variables are:

- Square root transformation (if the distribution differs moderately from normal)
- Log-transformation (if the distribution differs substantially from normal)
- Inverse transformation (if the distribution differs severely from normal)
- Make categorical (ordinal / dichotomous) (if the distribution differs severely from normal, and no transformations help)

==== Did the implementation of the study fulfill the intentions of the research design? ====
One should check the success of the randomization procedure, for instance by checking whether background and substantive variables are equally distributed within and across groups. If the study did not need or use a randomization procedure, one should check the success of the non-random sampling, for instance by checking whether all subgroups of the population of interest are represented in the sample.
Other possible data distortions that should be checked are:

- dropout (this should be identified during the initial data analysis phase)
- Item non-response (whether this is random or not should be assessed during the initial data analysis phase)
- Treatment quality (using manipulation checks).

==== Characteristics of data sample ====
In any report or article, the structure of the sample must be accurately described. It is especially important to exactly determine the size of the subgroup when subgroup analyses will be performed during the main analysis phase.
The characteristics of the data sample can be assessed by looking at:

- Basic statistics of important variables
- Scatter plots
- Correlations and associations
- Cross-tabulations

==== Final stage of the initial data analysis ====
During the final stage, the findings of the initial data analysis are documented, and necessary, preferable, and possible corrective actions are taken. Also, the original plan for the main data analyses can and should be specified in more detail or rewritten. In order to do this, several decisions about the main data analyses can and should be made:

- In the case of non-normals: should one transform variables; make variables categorical (ordinal/dichotomous); adapt the analysis method?
- In the case of missing data: should one neglect or impute the missing data; which imputation technique should be used?
- In the case of outliers: should one use robust analysis techniques?
- In case items do not fit the scale: should one adapt the measurement instrument by omitting items, or rather ensure comparability with other (uses of the) measurement instrument(s)?
- In the case of (too) small subgroups: should one drop the hypothesis about inter-group differences, or use small sample techniques, like exact tests or bootstrapping?
- In case the randomization procedure seems to be defective: can and should one calculate propensity scores and include them as covariates in the main analyses?

==== Analysis ====
Several analyses can be used during the initial data analysis phase:

- Univariate statistics (single variable)
- Bivariate associations (correlations)
- Graphical techniques (scatter plots)

It is important to take the measurement levels of the variables into account for the analyses, as special statistical techniques are available for each level:

- Nominal and ordinal variables
  - Frequency counts (numbers and percentages)
  - Associations
    - circumambulations (crosstabulations)
    - hierarchical loglinear analysis (restricted to a maximum of 8 variables)
    - loglinear analysis (to identify relevant/important variables and possible confounders)
  - Exact tests or bootstrapping (in case subgroups are small)
  - Computation of new variables
- Continuous variables
  - Distribution
    - Statistics (M, SD, variance, skewness, kurtosis)
    - Stem-and-leaf displays
    - Box plots

=== Main data analysis ===
In the main analysis phase, analyses aimed at answering the research question are performed as well as any other relevant analysis needed to write the first draft of the research report.

==== Exploratory and confirmatory approaches ====
In the main analysis phase, either an exploratory or confirmatory approach can be adopted. Usually the approach is decided before data is collected. In an exploratory analysis no clear hypothesis is stated before analysing the data, and the data is searched for models that describe the data well. In a confirmatory analysis, clear hypotheses about the data are tested.

Exploratory data analysis should be interpreted carefully. When testing multiple models at once there is a high chance on finding at least one of them to be significant, but this can be due to a type 1 error. It is important to always adjust the significance level when testing multiple models with, for example, a Bonferroni correction. Also, one should not follow up an exploratory analysis with a confirmatory analysis in the same dataset. An exploratory analysis is used to find ideas for a theory, but not to test that theory as well. When a model is found exploratory in a dataset, then following up that analysis with a confirmatory analysis in the same dataset could simply mean that the results of the confirmatory analysis are due to the same type 1 error that resulted in the exploratory model in the first place. The confirmatory analysis therefore will not be more informative than the original exploratory analysis.

==== Stability of results ====
It is important to obtain some indication about how generalizable the results are. While this is often difficult to check, one can look at the stability of the results. Are the results reliable and reproducible? There are two main ways of doing that.

- Cross-validation. By splitting the data into multiple parts, we can check if an analysis (like a fitted model) based on one part of the data generalizes to another part of the data as well. Cross-validation is generally inappropriate, though, if there are correlations within the data, e.g. with panel data. Hence other methods of validation sometimes need to be used. For more on this topic, see statistical model validation.
- Sensitivity analysis. A procedure to study the behavior of a system or model when global parameters are (systematically) varied. One way to do that is via bootstrapping.

== Free software for data analysis ==
Free software for data analysis include:

- DevInfo – A database system endorsed by the United Nations Development Group for monitoring and analyzing human development.
- ELKI – Data mining framework in Java with data mining oriented visualization functions.
- KNIME – The Konstanz Information Miner, a user friendly and comprehensive data analytics framework.
- Orange – A visual programming tool featuring interactive data visualization and methods for statistical data analysis, data mining, and machine learning.
- Pandas – Python library for data analysis.
- PAW – FORTRAN/C data analysis framework developed at CERN.
- R – A programming language and software environment for statistical computing and graphics.
- ROOT – C++ data analysis framework developed at CERN.
- SciPy – Python library for scientific computing.
- Julia – A programming language well-suited for numerical analysis and computational science.

== Reproducible analysis ==
The typical data analysis workflow involves collecting data, running analyses, creating visualizations, and writing reports. However, this workflow presents challenges, including a separation between analysis scripts and data, as well as a gap between analysis and documentation. Often, the correct order of running scripts is only described informally or resides in the data scientist's memory. The potential for losing this information creates issues for reproducibility.

To address these challenges, it is essential to document analysis script content and workflow. Additionally, overall documentation is crucial, as well as providing reports that are understandable by both machines and humans, and ensuring accurate representation of the analysis workflow even as scripts evolve.

== Data analysis contests ==
Different companies and organizations hold data analysis contests to encourage researchers to utilize their data or to solve a particular question using data analysis. A few examples of well-known international data analysis contests are:

- Kaggle competitions; the Kaggle platform is owned and run by Google.
- LTPP data analysis contest held by FHWA and ASCE.

== See also ==
- Actuarial science
- Analytics
- Augmented Analytics
- Business intelligence
- Data presentation architecture
- Exploratory data analysis
- List of datasets for machine-learning research
- List of data science software
- Machine learning
- Multiway data analysis
- Qualitative research
- Structured data analysis (statistics)
- Text mining
- Unstructured data
