= Data Quality Campaign =

American nonprofit organization

The Data Quality Campaign (DQC) is a nonpartisan, nonprofit advocacy organization launched in the United States in 2005 to improve the quality, accessibility and use of data in education.

== Overview ==
The Data Quality Campaign was founded in 2005, by Aimee Guidera and 10 founding partners as a national collaborative effort to encourage states to improve the collection and use of high-quality education data, and implement state longitudinal data systems to measure student achievement. It focused on its 10 Essential Elements of Statewide Longitudinal Data Systems. During this time, the campaign was managed by the National Center for Educational Achievement (NCEA).

By 2009, many states had implemented data systems but few were utilizing them to their full potential. The organization shifted focus to its 10 State Actions to Ensure Effective Data Use. Around the same time, the NCEA was being acquired by ACT, Inc. in 2007, and the Data Quality Campaign became a fully independent nonprofit organization in 2011.

Today, the Washington, DC–based organization leads a partnership of nearly 100 organizations.

== 10 Essential Elements ==
When the Campaign was launched, part of its mission was to promote 10 essential elements of a longitudinal data system to see a student's academic growth and the contribution of specific programs.

The elements are:
1. Student Identifier: A unique statewide student identifier that connects student data across key databases across years
2. Student Info: Student-level enrollment, demographic, and program participation information
3. Matching Student Test Records: The ability to match individual students' test records from year to year
4. Untested Student Info: Information on untested students and the reasons they were not tested
5. Teacher/Student Data Link: A teacher identifier system with the ability to match teachers to students
6. Transcript Data: Student-level transcript information, including information on courses completed and grades earned
7. College Readiness Scores: Student-level college readiness test scores
8. Graduation/Dropout Data: Student-level graduation and dropout data
9. P-12/Postsecondary Records Match: The ability to match student records between K-12 and higher education systems
10. Data Audit System: A state data audit system assessing data quality, validity, and reliability

The DQC continued to promote and monitor states' progress in establishing these elements until 2011. In September 2009, all 50 states agreed to implement the 12 America COMPETES Elements, which include DQC's 10 elements and today, states report that information to the Department of Education.

== 10 State Actions ==
DQC has identified 10 state actions to help ensure that states use the information available to them. Every year since 2010, it surveys states' progress through the Data for Action survey.

The actions are:
1. Link Data Systems: Link State K-12 data systems with early learning, postsecondary education, workforce, social services, and other agencies(currently in development)
2. Sustained Support: Create stable, sustained support for robust state longitudinal data systems (not yet achieved)
3. Governance Structures: Develop governance structures to guide data collection, sharing, and use
4. Data Repositories: Build state data repositories (e.g. data warehouses) that integrate student, staff, financial, and facility data
5. Timely Access to Data: Implement systems to provide all stakeholders with timely access to the information they need while protecting student privacy
6. Individual Progress Reports: Create progress reports with individual student data that provide information educators, parents and students can us to improve student performance
7. Aggregate Progress Reports: Create reports that include longitudinal statistics on school systems and groups of students to guide school-, district-, and state-level improvement efforts
8. Research Agenda: Develop a purposeful research agenda and collaborate with universities, researchers, and intermediary groups to explore the data for useful information (currently in development)
9. Professional Development: Implement policies and promote practices, including professional development and credentialing, to ensure educators know how to access, analyze, and use data appropriately (partially implemented – professional development is fully implemented; state not involved in credentialing process)
10. Raise Public Awareness: Promote strategies to raise awareness of available data and ensure that key stakeholders, including state policymakers, know how to access, analyze, and use the information

== Data for Action ==
The Data for Action (DFA) is an annual survey of all 50 states, Washington, D.C. and Puerto Rico on their progress toward implementing DQC's 10 State Actions. Each year, DQC invites each state's Governor's office to participate in the survey and uses their responses to analyze which state actions have been implemented in each state. Beyond the 10 state actions, the DFA also includes questions on other data issues and attempts to identify best practices in the field.

=== DFA 2010 ===
In 2010, not all states had yet implemented all 10 Essential Elements, so the 2010 DFA also measured states' progress on those, as well as the 10 State Actions. The 2010 DFA results showed that 24 states had implemented all 10 Essential Elements but all states had committed to implement them by September 2011. None of the states had implemented all 10 State Actions and 17 states could not link student and teacher data, while 11 states could not link K-12 data to postsecondary data. Based on these results, DQC concluded that while states were making progress in data collection, they were not using that data to improve student achievement, because the data could not be linked across different education systems and was not available to stakeholders . To combat these issues, DQC identified 5 state priorities for the upcoming year:/>

- Fulfill the 50-state commitment to implement the 10 Essential Elements by September 2011.
- Link K-12 with early childhood, postsecondary and workforce data to answer critical policy questions.
- Provide teachers, students and parents with access to longitudinal student-level data.
- Share data about teacher impact on student achievement with educator preparation institutions.
- Enact statewide preservice policies, including certification and licensure, and program approval, to build educator capacity to use data.

=== DFA 2011 ===
The results of the 2011 DFA revealed that states were still struggling with actually using the data that they collected. Most tellingly, the two State Actions that were most difficult for states to implement were Actions 5 and 9. Action 5 deals with making the data accessible to all stakeholder, including parents and teachers, while Action 9 deals with providing educators with the skills necessary to access the data and use it to help students. Based on its analysis of the 2011 DFA, DQC issued its "Game-Changing Priorities for States," to accelerate the implementation of the 10 State Actions. The priorities were:

1. Taking public input and identifying important policies that "will inform the development, implementation, and evaluation of the state’s data efforts"
2. Among K-12, pre-K, higher education, and workforce data governance bodies, establishing "decision-making authority" for tackling issues of data use
3. Reporting teacher effectiveness data to the schools that prepared them
4. Continuing to address the needs of end users by determining whether existing tools are effective and fixing or refining them when they are not

=== DFA 2012 ===
The results of the 2012 Data for Action survey revealed that only 10 states had implemented 8 or 9 of the 10 State Actions. While 35 states had the policies and funding to support a data system, only 5 made sure that it was accessible and usable for various stakeholders. Based on the results, DQC determined that this may partly be due to the fact that while legislation may allow states to collect the data, it often makes it difficult for them to actually share the data with important stakeholders, like educators and parents. Based on these findings, DQC concluded that it is time to change the culture surrounding data use in education and get the data into the hands of people who need it most, like parents in teachers. To help, they issued five recommendations to guide states in 2013:

- To implement a high-quality teacher-student data link, including a statewide "teacher of record" definition, a roster verification system, and the ability to link multiple educators per student per course.
- To develop a feedback loop to share teacher performance data with teacher preparation programs.
- To provide educators with access to timely data they can use to personalize instruction and push their own professional development.
- To focus professional development on helping teachers use data effectively.
- To develop teacher licensing and program approval policies that include having instructors prove they possess data literacy.

== Advocacy ==
DQC spoke out in favor of the Strengthening Education through Research Act (H.R. 4366; 113th Congress), a bill to amend and reauthorize the Education Sciences Reform Act of 2002 and authorize the appropriation of $615 million for fiscal year 2015 and $3.8 billion over the 2015-2019 period to support federal educational research, statistical analysis, and other activities.

== Publications ==
In addition to the yearly reports that DQC publishes based on the DFA, they also have a number of other publications, including one entitled "What Every Parent Should be Asking about Education Data" co-produced with the National PTA.

Other publications include, "Myth Busters: Getting the Facts Straight about Education Data", and a guide about communicating about issues associated with data collection and use in education "Let’s Give Them Something to Talk About: Tools for Communicating the Data Message."

== DQC Founding Partners ==
- Achieve, Inc.
- Alliance for Excellent Education
- Council of Chief State School Officers
- The Education Trust
- National Center for Educational Accountability
- National Center for Higher Education Management Systems
- National Governors Association Center for Best Practices
- Schools Interoperability Framework Association
- Standard & Poor's School Evaluation Services
- State Higher Education Executive Officers

== See also ==
- Data literacy
