= IBCS =

IBCS may refer to:

- Integrated Air and Missile Defense Battle Command System
- Input-Buffered Crossbar Switch
- The Institute For Black Catholic Studies at Xavier University of Louisiana
- Integrated Battlefield Control System
- Intel Binary Compatibility Standard (iBCS), an application binary interface for Intel microprocessors
- International Business Communication Standards
