= Strengthening Education through Research Act =

- Long title: To strengthen the Federal education research system to make research and evaluations more timely and relevant to State and local needs in order to increase student achievement.
- Acronyms (colloquial): SETRA
- Announced in: the 113th United States Congress
- Sponsored by: Rep. Todd Rokita (R, IN-4)
- Number of co-sponsors: 3

Codification
- Acts affected: Education Sciences Reform Act of 2002, Education Technical Assistance Act of 2002, National Assessment of Educational Progress Authorization Act, Elementary and Secondary Education Act of 1965, Higher Education Act of 1965, and others.
- U.S.C. sections affected: 20 U.S.C. § 6301 et seq., 20 U.S.C. § 6311 et seq., 20 U.S.C. § 9563, 20 U.S.C. § 9501, 20 U.S.C. § 9514, and others.
- Agencies affected: Institute of Education Sciences, United States Congress, National Assessment Governing Board, United States Department of Education, National Center for Education Statistics
- Authorizations of appropriations: $3,844,365,584

Legislative history
- Introduced in the House as H.R. 4366 by Rep. Todd Rokita (R, IN-4) on April 2, 2014; Committee consideration by United States House Committee on Education and the Workforce

The Strengthening Education through Research Act (H.R. 4366) or "SETRA" is a bill that would amend and reauthorize the Education Sciences Reform Act of 2002 and would authorize the appropriation of $615 million for fiscal year 2015 and $3.8 billion over the 2015-2019 period to support federal educational research, statistical analysis, and other activities.

The bill was introduced into the United States House of Representatives during the 113th United States Congress.

== Provisions of the bill ==
The bill would reauthorize the Education Sciences Reform Act of 2002. The bill would authorize the State Longitudinal Data System grant program.

== Congressional Budget Office report ==
This summary is based largely on the summary provided by the Congressional Budget Office, as ordered reported by the House Committee on Education and the Workforce on April 8, 2014. This is a public domain source.

H.R. 4366 would amend and reauthorize the Education Sciences Reform Act of 2002 through fiscal year 2020. (This authorization would automatically be extended one year through 2021 under the General Education Provisions Act.) The bill would authorize the appropriation of $615 million for fiscal year 2015 and $3.8 billion over the 2015-2019 period to support federal educational research, statistical analysis, and other activities.

The Congressional Budget Office (CBO) estimates that implementing the bill would cost $2.0 billion over the 2015-2019 period, assuming the appropriation of the authorized amounts. Enacting the bill would have no impact on direct spending or revenues; therefore, pay-as-you-go procedures do not apply.

H.R. 4366 contains no intergovernmental or private-sector mandates as defined in the Unfunded Mandates Reform Act.

== Procedural history ==
The Strengthening Education through Research Act was introduced into the United States House of Representatives on April 2, 2014 by Rep. Todd Rokita (R, IN-4). It was referred to the United States House Committee on Education and the Workforce. The bill was reported (amended) on April 29, 2014 alongside House Report 113-424. The bill was scheduled to be voted on under suspension of the rules on May 7, 2014.

== Debate and discussion ==
The Council for Exceptional Children, the National Center for Learning Disabilities, and the Higher Education Consortium for Special Education praised the bill because it "values the critical role of research in developing effective practices to support positive outcomes for children and youth with disabilities." However, according to the organizations, "actual funding amounts listed in the legislation remain inadequate to sufficiently address the nation’s special education research needs. This limited investment, coming as the result of rules adopted by the U.S. House of Representatives intended to rein in spending, is not enough to restore funding and increase the impact of future NCSER and special education research."

The Data Quality Campaign (DQC) was in favor of the bill, because it would "permit states to use federal funds to turn their attention to the important task of transforming the data they now collect into useful information and ensuring that key stakeholders have access to this tailored, timely, contextual information." DQC says that it "sees immense value in the ability to link data across early childhood education, K-12, postsecondary, and workforce systems," because it allows researchers to answer more complex questions that require data from multiple sources.

== See also ==
- List of bills in the 113th United States Congress
- Education in the United States
- List of issues in K-12 education in the United States
- History of education in the United States
