= OTCD =

OTCD may refer to:

- Ornithine transcarbamylase deficiency
- Over-the-counter data
- Over-the-counter derivative, see over-the-counter (finance)
- Over-the-counter drug
- On the Company Dime
