= Barbara Minto =

American author and consultant

- Education: Harvard Business School (MBA)
- Occupations: Author, consultant

Barbara Minto is an American author and consultant focused on the subject of executive communication.

== Biography ==
Minto's career began as a secretary at an American railway company in the 1950s "making 400 bucks a month". Concerned that her supervisor's age and ill-health would result in the loss of her well-paying position, she applied to Harvard Business School, which at the time did not require an undergraduate degree, and was admitted upon passing the entry exam.

Minto graduated from Harvard Business School in 1963. She was one of only eight women to graduate in a class of 600. Minto was the first female MBA hired by McKinsey & Company, starting with the firm in Cleveland, Ohio in 1963, and moving to London in 1966, where she served until 1973.

After layoffs at McKinsey arising from the 1973 Oil Crisis, Minto began her own training business focused on the executive communication techniques she pioneered during her tenure.

Minto published her book, The Pyramid Principle: Logic in Writing and Thinking, in 1985, and an upgraded edition entitled The Minto Pyramid Principle: Logic in Writing, Thinking and Problem Solving in 1996.

She continues to conduct training sessions for small groups of participants globally, through her business Minto Books International, Inc.

== Work ==
Minto is the originator of the MECE principle pronounced "Meece" (Barbara pronounces it with one syllable, meece, rhyming with "niece" or "Greece") a grouping principle for separating a set of items into subsets that are mutually exclusive (ME) and collectively exhaustive (CE).

MECE underlies her Minto Pyramid Principle, which suggests that people's ideas should be communicated in a pyramid format in which ideas are organized top-down, starting with a main idea that is a high-level summary of supporting key ideas, each of which is derived from further supporting sub-points. Minto argues that humans naturally impose this kind of hierarchy on information we receive, so communication that mirrors this pattern is clearer and more effective.

Minto argues that one "can’t derive an idea from a grouping unless the ideas in the grouping are logically the same, and in logical order.” The Minto Pyramid Principle is adopted in management consulting to assist in presenting complex information.

== Publications ==
Books

- 1985: The Pyramid Principle: Logic in Writing and Thinking
- 1996: The Minto Pyramid Principle: Logic in Writing, Thinking and Problem Solving
