= International Business Communication Standards =

Open standards for business communication

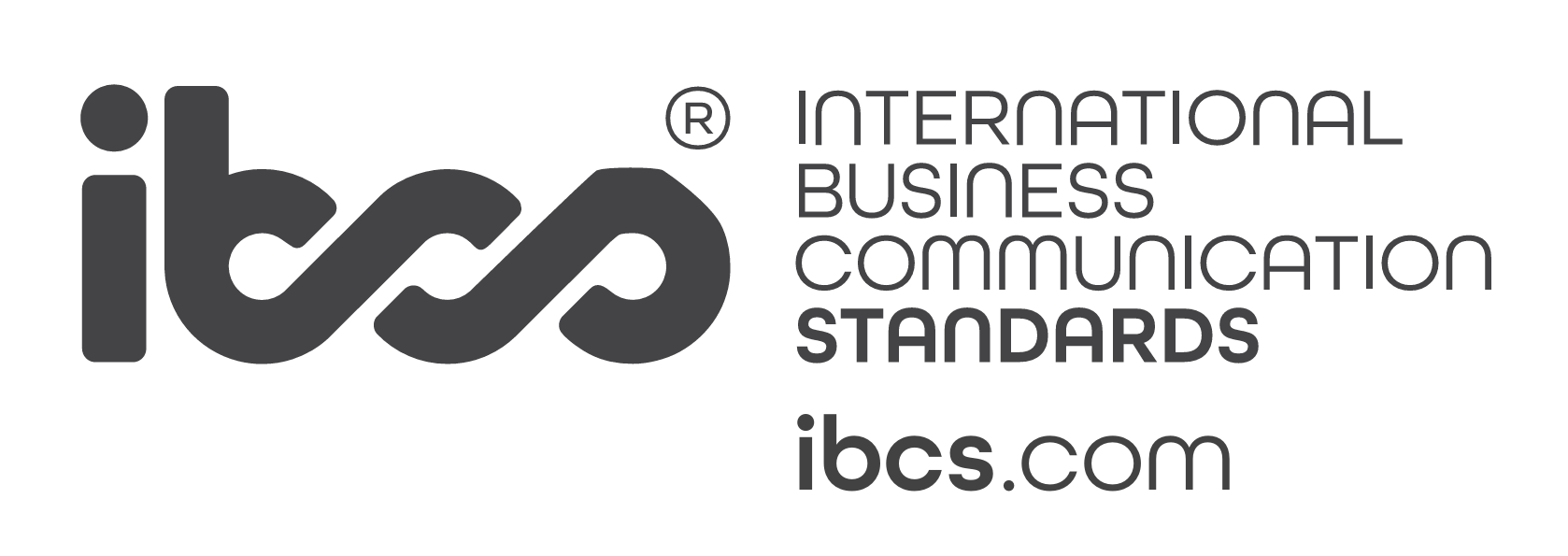
International Business Communication Standards (IBCS) Logo

The International Business Communication Standards (IBCS) are practical proposals for designing business communication, available for free use under a Creative Commons license (CC BY-SA). IBCS are used to optimize reports, presentations, and dashboards in terms of their conceptual design, visual perception, and semantic notation. The IBCS proposals formed the basis of the "ISO/AWI 24896 Standard notation for business reports" project, launched in July 2024.

== Requirements ==
Business communication meets IBCS standards if it adheres to the rules of the following three pillars:

- Conceptual rules assist in the clear transmission of content by providing an appropriate storyline. These rules draw on the work of authors such as Barbara Minto. Based on scientific studies and practical experience, they are widely recognized. These conceptual rules are divided into the SAY and STRUCTURE themes from the SUCCESS concept.
- Perceptual rules assist in the clear transmission of content by ensuring suitable visual design. These rules are based on the work of authors like William Playfair, Willard Cope Brinton, Gene Zelazny, Edward Tufte and Stephen Few. These rules are also widely recognized based on scientific research and practical experience. These perceptual rules are divided into the EXPRESS, CHECK, CONDENSE, and SIMPLIFY themes from the SUCCESS concept.
- Semantic rules assist in the clear transmission of content by ensuring a uniform notation (IBCS Notation). These rules are based on the work of Rolf Hichert and other contributors to the IBCS Association. As these semantic rules are purely conventional, they must become widely accepted to become standard. These semantic rules are part of the UNIFY theme of the SUCCESS concept.

=== IBCS Notation ===
IBCS Notation is the term for the semantic rules of IBCS. IBCS Notation governs the standardization of terminology (e.g., terms, abbreviations, and number formats), descriptive texts (e.g., messages, titles, legends, and labels), dimensions (e.g., metrics, scenarios, and time periods), analyses (e.g., variance analyses and time series analyses), and indicators (e.g., symbols for highlights or scaling).

=== IBCS Association ===
The IBCS Association continues to review and develop the International Business Communication Standards. As a non-profit organization, it publishes the standards for free use and ensures detailed consultation and discussion before releasing new versions. This includes a global effort to seek public input. The IBCS standards, version 1.0, were unanimously recommended for publication by active members at the general assembly on June 18, 2015, in Amsterdam. Version 1.1 was released in 2017, and version 1.2 in 2021. As of June 2024, the IBCS Association has 12,384 members from 139 countries. Rolf Hichert is the president of the IBCS Association.

=== IBCS Institute ===
The IBCS Institute, founded in 2004, serves as the host, training institute, and certification authority of the IBCS Creative Commons project. Its roots date back to the 1980s when Rolf Hichert consulted for McKinsey & Company, where he met Gene Zelazny and other pioneers in the conceptual and visual design of reports and presentations. Since 2020, the IBCS Institute has been led by Jürgen Faisst. Since July 2024, Edyta Szarska has been the second managing partner.

=== ISO/AWI 24896 ===
In July 2024, the new project "ISO/AWI 24896 Standard notation for business reports" was registered in Technical Committee ISO/TC 37. Experts from 12 countries are working on developing a standard notation for business reports. The draft presented by an ISO/TC 37 working group as part of the project application is based on proposals from the IBCS Association.

== Literature ==
- William Playfair: The Commercial and Political Atlas, 1786.
- Willard Cope Brinton: Graphic Methods for Presenting Facts, 1914.
- Gene Zelazny: How to Make Numbers into Pictures, Gabler, 2002.
- Edward Tufte: The Visual Display of Quantitative Information, 2nd Edition, 2011.
- Stephen Few: Show Me the Numbers, 2nd Edition, 2012.
- B. Shneiderman: The Eyes Have It: A Task by Data Type Taxonomy for Information Visualizations, In: Proceedings of the IEEE Symposium on Visual Languages, pp. 336–343, Washington.
- Hichert, Faisst et al.: International Business Communication Standards, IBCS Version 1.1, 2017.
- Rolf Hichert and Jürgen Faisst: Unified, Framed, Shaded – How Visual Uniformity Improves Communication with Reports, Presentations, and Dashboards, Vahlen, 2019.
