= Grover Whitehurst =

Grover J. "Russ" Whitehurst is the Herman and George R. Brown Chair and director of the Brown Center on Education Policy at the Brookings Institution. His research primarily focuses on program evaluation, teacher quality, preschools, national and international student assessments, reading instruction, education technology, and education data systems.

Previously, he was the director of the Institute of Education Sciences (IES), which is the research arm of the United States Department of Education, and U.S. assistant secretary for Educational Research and Improvement. Prior to these positions, Whitehurst served as Lead Professor and Chair of the Department of Psychology at the State University of New York at Stony Brook.

A program he developed to enhance school readiness in children from low-income families, Dialogic Reading, is widely used in preschools around the world. He was a pioneer in delivering college-level instruction through the internet, for which he was awarded the Microsoft Innovators in Higher Education Award in 1996.

He received his Ph.D. in experimental child psychology from the University of Illinois at Urbana-Champaign in 1970.
