= Council of Chief State School Officers =

Non-partisan, non-profit organization

The Council of Chief State School Officers (CCSSO) is a non-partisan, non-profit organization of public officials who head departments of elementary and secondary education in the U.S. states, the District of Columbia, the Department of Defense Education Activity, the Bureau of Indian Education, and five U.S. territories.

The council's areas of focus are education workforce; information systems and research; next generation learners; and standards, assessment, and accountability. One of its nationally recognized projects is the National Teacher of the Year award. Other efforts include the "Interstate New Teacher Assessment and Support Consortium" (est. 1987). Recent initiatives include a "Shared Learning Collaborative" (est. 2011); and an "Innovation Lab Network" of states, "to assess skills expected by the Common Core."

As of 1981, peer organizations include the American Association of School Administrators, National Association of State Boards of Education, National Congress of Parents and Teachers, National Education Association, and National School Boards Association.

== See also ==
- Common Core State Standards Initiative (adopted 2010), co-sponsored by the council
- Data Quality Campaign, co-founded by the council
- National Council for Accreditation of Teacher Education (est. 1952), co-founded by the council
