= Data system =

Collection of symbols and manipulating operations

Data system is an organized collection of symbols and processes that may be used to operate on such symbols. Any organised collection of symbols and symbol-manipulating operations can be considered a data system. Hence, human-speech analysed at the level of phonemes can be considered a data system as can the Incan artefact of the khipu and an image stored as pixels. A data system is defined in terms of some data model and bears a resemblance to the idea of a physical symbol system.

Symbols within some data systems may be persistent or not. Hence, the sounds of human speech are non-persistent symbols because they decay rapidly in air. In contrast, pixels stored on some peripheral storage device are persistent symbols.

== Education ==
In education, a data system is a computer system that aims to provide educators with student data to help solve educational problems. Examples of data systems include Student Information Systems (SISs), assessment systems, Instructional Management Systems (IMSs), and data-warehousing systems, but distinctions between different types of data systems are blurring as these separate systems begin to serve more of the same functions. Data systems that present data to educators in an over-the-counter data format embed labels, supplemental documentation, and help system and make key package/display and content decisions to improve the accuracy of data system users’ data analyses.

== See also ==
- CRUD
- Data processing
- Longitudinal data system
- Paul Beynon-Davies
- Persistent data structure
- Persistence (computer science)
