= Jenny Grant Rankin =

American educational researcher and author

Jenny Grant Rankin is an American researcher and author. She is known for her work in improving data presentation, instruction, psychology, and parenting.

== Early life and education ==
Rankin's degrees include a Bachelor of Arts (BA) from University of California, Santa Barbara (UCSB) and a Doctor of Philosophy (PhD) from Northcentral University in 2013. She received an Honorary Doctor of Humane Letters from University of La Verne in 2019.

== Career ==
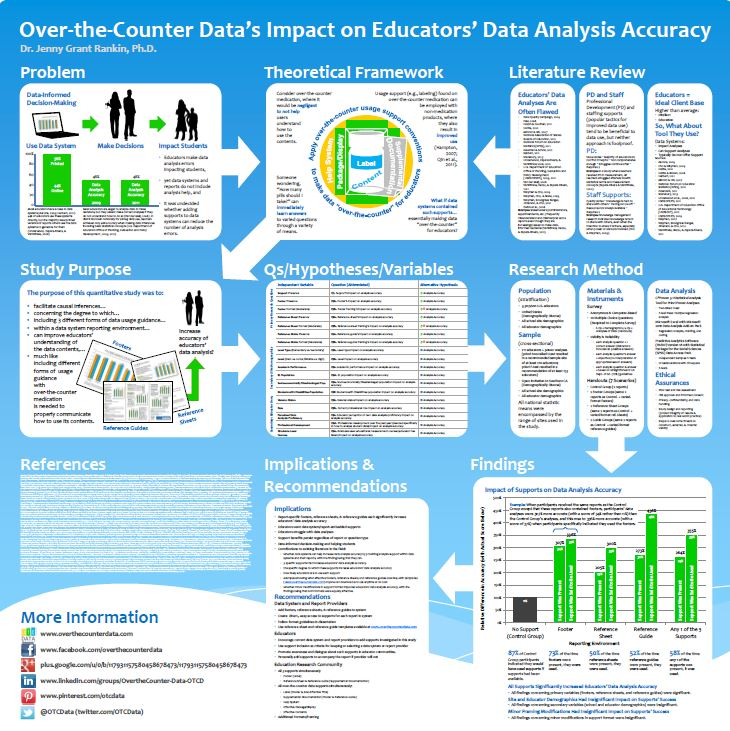
Infographic of OTCD study by Rankin

Rankin's graduate work was on over-the-counter data standards. She has worked in higher education, secondary education, and as chief education & research officer (CERO) and lectured at University of Cambridge, University of Oxford and Columbia University.

She was honored by the US White House, and the American flag was flown over the Capitol Building in honor of Rankin, at the request of Christopher Cox.

She is a member of Mensa, is a public speaker, and a columnist for Psychology Today. Rankin serves as a Fulbright Specialist in the United States' Department of State.

== Selected publications ==
- Rankin, J. G. (2019). Sharing Your Education Expertise with the World: Make research resonate and widen your impact. New York, NY: Routledge/Taylor & Francis.
- Rankin, J. G. (2017). First aid for teacher burnout: How you can find peace and success. New York, NY: Routledge/Taylor & Francis.
- Rankin, J. G. (2016). How to make data work: A guide for educational leaders. New York, NY: Routledge/Taylor & Francis.
- Rankin, J. G. (2016). Engaging & challenging gifted students: Tips for supporting extraordinary minds in your classroom. Alexandra, VA
