= Information continuum =

The term information continuum is used to describe the whole set of all information, in connection with information management. The term may be used in reference to the information or the information infrastructure of a people, a species, a scientific subject or an institution.

== Other usages ==
- in biological anthropology, term information continuum is related to study of social information transfer and evolution of communication in animals.
- the Internet is sometimes called an information continuum.
