= Education Sciences Reform Act of 2002 =

The Education Sciences Reform Act of 2002 was an act in the United States, passed by the Bush administration in November 2002. Among other motions, the act created the Institute of Education Sciences, a research arm of the United States Department of Education. There are many formal names for the bill, which include:

- Education Sciences Reform Act of 2002
- National Assessment of Educational Progress Authorization Act
- Educational Technical Assistance Act of 2002
- Education Sciences Reform Act of 2002
- Educational Technical Assistance Act of 2002
- National Assessment of Educational Progress Authorization Act

In 2011, a technical amendment was made to the bill to introduce the Budget Control Act of 2011, which increased the debt ceiling of the US federal government.

== Amendments ==
=== Proposed ===
On April 2, 2014, Rep. Todd Rokita introduced the Strengthening Education through Research Act (H.R. 4366; 113th Congress) into the United States House of Representatives. The bill would amend and reauthorize the Education Sciences Reform Act of 2002 and would authorize the appropriation of $615 million for fiscal year 2015 and $3.8 billion over the 2015-2019 period to support federal educational research, statistical analysis, and other activities.
