= Institute of Education Sciences =

United States Department of Education research branch

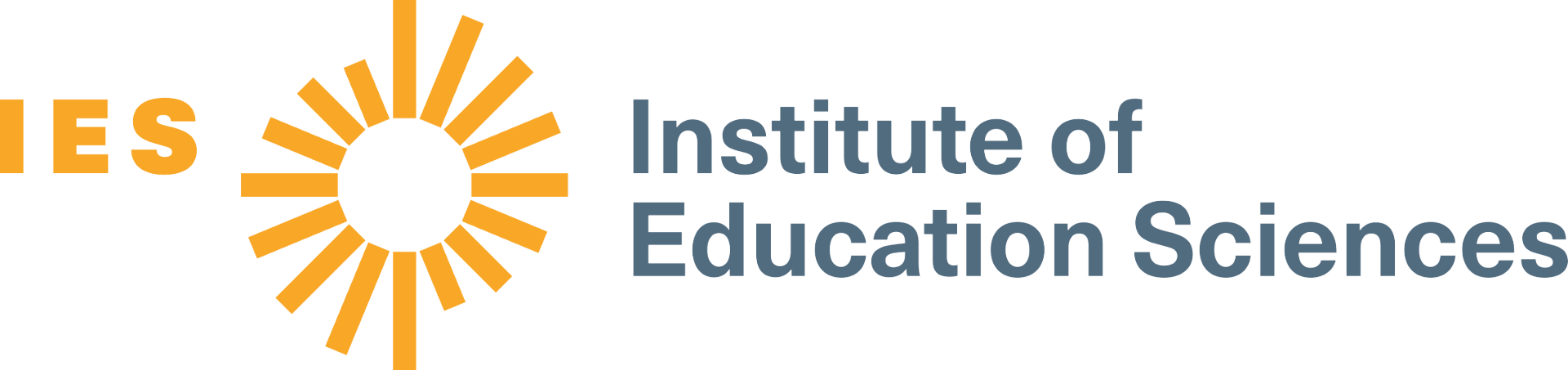

Agency overview
- Headquarters: Potomac Center Plaza; 550 12th St, SW, Washington, DC, US; 38°53′00″N 77°01′39″W
- Parent department: United States Department of Education
- Website: ies.ed.gov

The Institute of Education Sciences (IES) is the independent, non-partisan statistics, research, and evaluation arm of the U.S. Department of Education. IES' stated mission is to provide scientific evidence on which to ground education practice and policy and to share this information in formats that are useful and accessible to educators, parents, policymakers, researchers, and the public. It was created as part of the Education Sciences Reform Act of 2002.

The first director of IES was Grover Whitehurst, who was appointed in November 2002 and served for six years. As of March 2024, Matthew Soldner is the acting Director of IES.

== Divisions ==
IES is divided into four major research and statistics centers:

- National Center for Education Evaluation and Regional Assistance (NCEE)—NCEE conducts large-scale evaluations and provides research-based technical assistance and information about high-quality research to educators and policymakers in a variety of different formats. NCEE's work includes evaluations of education programs and practices supported by federal funds; the Regional Educational Laboratory Program; the Education Resources Information Center (ERIC); the What Works Clearinghouse; and the National Library of Education. Matthew Soldner is the Commissioner of NCEE.
- National Center for Education Research (NCER)—NCER supports research to improve student outcomes and education quality in the United States and pursue workable solutions to the challenges faced by educators and the education community. NCER also supports training programs to prepare researchers to conduct high quality, scientific education research. Elizabeth Albro is the Commissioner of NCER.
- National Center for Education Statistics (NCES)—NCES is the primary federal entity that collects and analyzes data related to education in the US and other nations. Among the programs and initiatives that NCES oversees is the National Assessment of Educational Progress. James Lynn Woodworth is the Commissioner of NCES.
- National Center for Special Education Research (NCSER)—NCSER sponsors and supports comprehensive research that is designed to expand the knowledge and understanding of infants, toddlers, and children with disabilities, or those who are at risk of developing disabilities. NCSER also supports training programs to prepare researchers to conduct high quality, scientific special education research. Joan E. McLaughlin is the commissioner of NCSER.

== National Board for Education Sciences ==
The National Board for Education Sciences serves as an advisory board for IES and has 15 voting members, who are appointed by the President of the United States. The Board also includes several ex-officio, non-voting members, including the director of IES, the commissioners of the four centers, and representatives of the National Institute of Child Health and Human Development, the U.S. Census Bureau, the U.S. Department of Labor, and the National Science Foundation. The Board advises and consults with the director and the commissioners to identify research and organizational priorities for IES. On October 7, 2022, President Biden announced the intention to appointment 15 new members to the NBES. Larry Hedges, of Northwestern University, was previously the chairman of the National Board for Education Sciences.

== Appointment controversies ==
In the winter of 2020–2021, after the election of President Joe Biden but prior to his inauguration in January, the Trump administration carried out several eleventh-hour appointments, including filling the NBES board where vacancies had existed for several years. Many of these appointment choices were harshly criticized by education organizations for a lack of academic or educational research credentials.

In May 2021, two of the new NBES appointees, Steve Hanke and John Yoo, both professors, published a commentary in The Wall Street Journal, arguing that their Board commission documents and those of others had been duly signed and certified during the Trump administration and sent to the office of the Secretary of Education. Yet, the new Secretary, Miguel Cardona, refused to acknowledge the appointments, deliver the credentials, or facilitate statutorily required Board meetings. In their Wall Street Journal commentary, the professors asserted that the circumstances mirrored those of the landmark 1803 US Supreme Court case Marbury v. Madison. In July 2021, the Pacific Legal Foundation claimed that they had obtained emails from White House officials confirming that Department of Education officials were in possession of the credentials and that the foundation had sent a demand letter on behalf of Hanke and Yoo. In August, Pacific Legal Foundation filed suit on behalf of Hanke and Yoo in the US District Court for The District of Columbia against Secretary Cardona and the Department of Education. The suit acknowledged that NBES Board members can be removed by the administration, but argued that it must do so transparently and cannot withhold credentials or obstruct the Board's statutorily required duties.

On September 3, 2021, the Biden administration acknowledged the validity of the appointments and formally terminated them, leading to a withdrawal of the suit.

== Work stoppage ==
On February 10, 2025, the Department of Government Efficiency (DOGE), a unit within the Trump administration run by Elon Musk, announced plans to cancel most of IES' contracts, amounting to $881 million in cuts across 169 contracts. Dozens of researchers and contractors received notices directing them to immediately stop work on research projects and program evaluations financed by IES, including contracts involving student resources that were in-progress. The institute is "all but shut down."

== See also ==
- Title 34 of the Code of Federal Regulations
