= Collectively exhaustive events =

Set of events whose union covers the entire sample space

In probability theory and logic, a set of events is jointly or collectively exhaustive if at least one of the events must occur. For example, when rolling a six-sided die, the events 1, 2, 3, 4, 5, and 6 are collectively exhaustive, because they encompass the entire range of possible outcomes.

Another way to describe collectively exhaustive events is that their union must cover all the events within the entire sample space. For example, events A and B are said to be collectively exhaustive if

$$A  \cup B = S$$

where S is the sample space.

Compare this to the concept of a set of mutually exclusive events. In such a set no more than one event can occur at a given time. (In some forms of mutual exclusion only one event can ever occur.) The set of all possible die rolls is both mutually exclusive and collectively exhaustive (i.e., "MECE"). The events 1 and 6 are mutually exclusive but not collectively exhaustive. The events "even" (2,4 or 6) and "not-6" (1,2,3,4, or 5) are also collectively exhaustive but not mutually exclusive. In some forms of mutual exclusion only one event can ever occur, whether collectively exhaustive or not. For example, tossing a particular biscuit for a group of several dogs cannot be repeated, no matter which dog snaps it up.

One example of an event that is both collectively exhaustive and mutually exclusive is tossing a coin. The outcome must be either heads or tails, or p (heads or tails) = 1, so the outcomes are collectively exhaustive. When heads occurs, tails can't occur, or p (heads and tails) = 0, so the outcomes are also mutually exclusive.

Another example of events being collectively exhaustive and mutually exclusive at same time are, event "even" (2,4 or 6) and event "odd" (1,3 or 5) in a random experiment of rolling a six-sided die. These both events are mutually exclusive because even and odd outcome can never occur at same time. The union of both "even" and "odd" events give sample space of rolling the die, hence are collectively exhaustive.

== History ==
The term "exhaustive" has been used in the literature since at least 1914. Here are a few examples:

The following appears as a footnote on page 23 of Couturat's text, The Algebra of Logic (1914):

"As Mrs. LADD·FRANKLlN has truly remarked (BALDWIN, Dictionary of Philosophy and Psychology, article "Laws of Thought"), the principle of contradiction is not sufficient to define contradictories; the principle of excluded middle must be added which equally deserves the name of principle of contradiction. This is why Mrs. LADD-FRANKLIN proposes to call them respectively the principle of exclusion and the principle of exhaustion, inasmuch as, according to the first, two contradictory terms are exclusive (the one of the other); and, according to the second, they are exhaustive (of the universe of discourse)." (italics added for emphasis)

In Stephen Kleene's discussion of cardinal numbers, in Introduction to Metamathematics (1952), he uses the term "mutually exclusive" together with "exhaustive":

"Hence, for any two cardinals M and N, the three relationships M < N, M = N and M > N are 'mutually exclusive', i.e. not more than one of them can hold. ¶ It does not appear till an advanced stage of the theory . . . whether they are 'exhaustive' , i.e. whether at least one of the three must hold". (italics added for emphasis, Kleene 1952:11; original has double bars over the symbols M and N).

== See also ==
- Event structure
- MECE principle
- Probability theory
- Set theory

== Additional sources ==
- Kemeny, John G.; et al. (1959). Finite Mathematical Structures. Englewood Cliffs, N.J.: Prentice-Hall. ASIN B0006AW17Y. LCCCN: 59-12841
- Tarski, Alfred (1941). Introduction to Logic and to the Methodology of Deductive Sciences (Reprint of 1946 2nd edition (paperback) ed.). New York: Dover Publications, Inc. ISBN 0-486-28462-X.
