= Augmented Analytics =

Data analytics approach

Augmented Analytics is an approach of data analytics that employs the use of machine learning and natural language processing to automate analysis processes normally done by a specialist or data scientist. The term was introduced in 2017 by Rita Sallam, Cindi Howson, and Carlie Idoine in a Gartner research paper.

Augmented analytics is based on business intelligence and analytics. In the graph extraction step, data from different sources are investigated.

== Defining Augmented Analytics ==
- Machine Learning – a systematic computing method that uses algorithms to sift through data to identify relationships, trends, and patterns. It is a process that allows algorithms to dynamically learn from data instead of having a set base of programmed rules.
- Natural language generation (NLG) – a software capability that takes unstructured data and translates it into plain-English, readable, language.
- Automating Insights – using machine learning algorithms to automate data analysis processes.
- Natural Language Query – enabling users to query data using business terms that are either typed onto a search box or spoken.

== Data Democratization ==
Data Democratization is the democratizing data access in order to relieve data congestion and get rid of any sense of data "gatekeepers". This process must be implemented alongside a method for users to make sense of the data. This process is used in hopes of speeding up company decision making and uncovering opportunities hidden in data.

There are three aspects to democratising data:

1. Data Parameterisation and Characterisation.
2. Data Decentralisation using an OS of blockchain and DLT technologies, as well as an independently governed secure data exchange to enable trust.
3. Consent Market-driven Data Monetisation.

When it comes to connecting assets, there are two features that will accelerate the adoption and usage of data democratisation: decentralized identity management and business data object monetization of data ownership. It enables multiple individuals and organizations to identify, authenticate, and authorize participants and organizations, enabling them to access services, data or systems across multiple networks, organizations, environments, and use cases. It empowers users and enables a personalized, self-service digital onboarding system so that users can self-authenticate without relying on a central administration function to process their information. Simultaneously, decentralized identity management ensures the user is authorized to perform actions subject to the system’s policies based on their attributes (role, department, organization, etc.) and/ or physical location.

== Use cases ==
- Agriculture – Farmers collect data on water use, soil temperature, moisture content and crop growth, augmented analytics can be used to make sense of this data and possibly identify insights that the user can then use to make business decisions.
- Smart Cities – Many cities across the United States, known as Smart Cities collect large amounts of data on a daily basis. Augmented analytics can be used to simplify this data in order to increase effectiveness in city management (transportation, natural disasters, etc.).
- Analytic Dashboards – Augmented analytics has the ability to take large data sets and create highly interactive and informative analytical dashboards that assist in many organizational decisions.
- Augmented Data Discovery – Using an augmented analytics process can assist organizations in automatically finding, visualizing and narrating potentially important data correlations and trends.
- Data Preparation – Augmented analytics platforms have the ability to take large amounts of data and organize and "clean" the data in order for it to be usable for future analyses.
- Business – Businesses collect large amounts of data, daily. Some examples of types of data collected in business operations include; sales data, consumer behavior data, distribution data. An augmented analytics platform provides access to analysis of this data, which could be used in making business decisions.
