= Mutual exclusivity =

Two propositions or events that cannot both be true

In logic and probability theory, two events (or propositions) are mutually exclusive or disjoint if they cannot both occur at the same time. A clear example is the set of outcomes of a single coin toss, which can result in either heads or tails, but not both.

In the coin-tossing example, both outcomes are, in theory, collectively exhaustive, which means that at least one of the outcomes must happen, so these two possibilities together exhaust all the possibilities. However, not all mutually exclusive events are collectively exhaustive. For example, the outcomes 1 and 4 of a single roll of a six-sided die are mutually exclusive (both cannot happen at the same time) but not collectively exhaustive (there are other possible outcomes; 2,3,5,6).

== Logic ==
In logic, two propositions $\phi$ and $\psi$ are mutually exclusive if it is not logically possible for them to be true at the same time; that is, $\lnot (\phi \land \psi)$ is a tautology. To say that more than two propositions are mutually exclusive, depending on the context, means either 1. "$\lnot (\phi_1 \land \phi_2) \and \lnot (\phi_1 \land \phi_3) \and \lnot (\phi_2 \land \phi_3)$ is a tautology" (it is not logically possible for more than one proposition to be true) or 2. "$\lnot (\phi_1 \land \phi_2 \land \phi_3)$ is a tautology" (it is not logically possible for all propositions to be true at the same time). The term pairwise mutually exclusive always means the former.

== Probability ==
In probability theory, events E_{1}, E_{2}, ..., E_{n} are said to be mutually exclusive if the occurrence of any one of them implies the non-occurrence of the remaining n − 1 events. Therefore, two mutually exclusive events cannot both occur. Formally said, $X$ is a set of mutually exclusive events if and only if given any $E_i, E_j \in X$, if $E_i \neq E_j$ then $E_i \cap E_j = \varnothing$. As a consequence, mutually exclusive events have the property: $P(A \cap B) = 0$.

For example, in a standard 52-card deck with two colors it is impossible to draw a card that is both red and a club because clubs are always black. If just one card is drawn from the deck, either a red card (heart or diamond) or a black card (club or spade) will be drawn. When A and B are mutually exclusive, P(A ∪ B) = P(A) + P(B). To find the probability of drawing a red card or a club, for example, add together the probability of drawing a red card and the probability of drawing a club. In a standard 52-card deck, there are twenty-six red cards and thirteen clubs: 26/52 + 13/52 = 39/52 or 3/4.

One would have to draw at least two cards in order to draw both a red card and a club. The probability of doing so in two draws depends on whether the first card drawn was replaced before the second drawing since without replacement there is one fewer card after the first card was drawn. The probabilities of the individual events (red, and club) are multiplied rather than added. The probability of drawing a red and a club in two drawings without replacement is then 26/52 × 13/51 × 2 = 676/2652, or 13/51. With replacement, the probability would be 26/52 × 13/52 × 2 = 676/2704, or 13/52.

In probability theory, the word or allows for the possibility of both events happening. The probability of one or both events occurring is denoted P(A ∪ B) and in general, it equals P(A) + P(B) – P(A ∩ B). Therefore, in the case of drawing a red card or a king, drawing any of a red king, a red non-king, or a black king is considered a success. In a standard 52-card deck, there are twenty-six red cards and four kings, two of which are red, so the probability of drawing a red or a king is 26/52 + 4/52 – 2/52 = 28/52.

Events are collectively exhaustive if all the possibilities for outcomes are exhausted by those possible events, so at least one of those outcomes must occur. The probability that at least one of the events will occur is equal to one. For example, there are theoretically only two possibilities for flipping a coin. Flipping a head and flipping a tail are collectively exhaustive events, and there is a probability of one of flipping either a head or a tail. Events can be both mutually exclusive and collectively exhaustive. In the case of flipping a coin, flipping a head and flipping a tail are also mutually exclusive events. Both outcomes cannot occur for a single trial (i.e., when a coin is flipped only once). The probability of flipping a head and the probability of flipping a tail can be added to yield a probability of 1: 1/2 + 1/2 = 1.

== Statistics ==
In statistics and regression analysis, an independent variable that can take on only two possible values is called a dummy variable. For example, it may take on the value 0 if an observation is of a white subject or 1 if the observation is of a black subject. The two possible categories associated with the two possible values are mutually exclusive, so that no observation falls into more than one category, and the categories are exhaustive, so that every observation falls into some category. Sometimes there are three or more possible categories, which are pairwise mutually exclusive and are collectively exhaustive — for example, under 18 years of age, 18 to 64 years of age, and age 65 or above. In this case a set of dummy variables is constructed, each dummy variable having two mutually exclusive and jointly exhaustive categories — in this example, one dummy variable (called D_{1}) would equal 1 if age is less than 18, and would equal 0 otherwise; a second dummy variable (called D_{2}) would equal 1 if age is in the range 18–64, and 0 otherwise. In this set-up, the dummy variable pairs (D_{1}, D_{2}) can have the values (1,0) (under 18), (0,1) (between 18 and 64), or (0,0) (65 or older) (but not (1,1), which would nonsensically imply that an observed subject is both under 18 and between 18 and 64). Then the dummy variables can be included as independent (explanatory) variables in a regression. The number of dummy variables is always one less than the number of categories: with the two categories black and white there is a single dummy variable to distinguish them, while with the three age categories two dummy variables are needed to distinguish them.

Such qualitative data can also be used for dependent variables. For example, a researcher might want to predict whether someone gets arrested or not, using family income or race, as explanatory variables. Here the variable to be explained is a dummy variable that equals 0 if the observed subject does not get arrested and equals 1 if the subject does get arrested. In such a situation, ordinary least squares (the basic regression technique) is widely seen as inadequate; instead probit regression or logistic regression is used. Further, sometimes there are three or more categories for the dependent variable — for example, no charges, charges, and death sentences. In this case, the multinomial probit or multinomial logit technique is used.

== See also ==
- Contrariety
- Dichotomy
- Disjoint sets
- Double bind
- Event structure
- Oxymoron
- Synchronicity
- MECE principle (mutually exclusive and collectively exhaustive)
