= Longitudinal data system =

Longitudinal data system is a data system capable of tracking student information over multiple years in multiple schools. The term appears in Federal law of the United States to describe such a system. Federal funding is provided to aid the design and implementation of such systems.
