= Paul Beynon-Davies =

British academic and writer

- Born: 1957; Rhondda, Wales
- Occupations: Academic, author, consultant
- Website: http://www.cardiff.ac.uk/carbs/faculty/beynon-daviesp/index.html

Paul Beynon-Davies (born 1957) is a British academic, author and consultant.

== Biography ==
Born in Rhondda, Wales, he received his Bachelor of Science in Economics and Social Science and PhD in Computing from the University of Wales College, Cardiff.

Before taking up an academic post, he worked for several years in the UK as a computer programmer and business analyst, in both the public and private sectors. He entered academia in the mid-1980s and has held positions at the University of Glamorgan, Swansea University and most recently Cardiff University. His inter-disciplinary interests began with this PhD thesis, which considered the application of computing in ethnography.

Beynon-Davies is currently a professor emeritus at the Cardiff Business School, Cardiff University and still lives in South Wales. He is married with three children.

== Books ==
- Systemes d'information. Afnor. Translated by David Avison. (1992)
- Expert Database Systems: A Gentle Introduction. McGraw-Hill, Basingstoke. (1991)
- Relational Database Systems. McGraw-Hill, Basingstoke. (1991)
- Knowledge Engineering for Information Systems. McGraw-Hill, Basingstoke. (1992)
- Relational Database Design. McGraw-Hill, Basingstoke. (1992)
- Analysing Information Systems Failures: A Practical Approach. Pitman/THES Publications, London, UK. (1997)
- Information Systems Development: An Introduction to Information Systems Engineering. 3rd Ed. Macmillan. (1998)
- Systemy Baz Danych. Warsaw, Wydawnictwa Naukowo-Techniczne. (1998)
- Inzynieria Systemow Informacyjnych. Warsaw, Wydawnictwa Naukowo-Techniczne. (1999)
- Information Systems: An Introduction to Informatics in Organisations. Palgrave, Basingstoke, UK. (2002) ISBN 0-333-96390-3
- e-Business. Palgrave, Basingstoke. (2004) ISBN 1-4039-1348-X
- Database Systems. 3rd Edition. Palgrave, Basingstoke, UK. (2004) ISBN 1-4039-1601-2
- Significance: Exploring the Nature of Information, Systems and Technology (2011) ISBN 0-230-27519-2
- Business Information Systems. 2nd edition. Palgrave, Basingstoke. (2013) ISBN 978-0-230-20368-6
- e-Business. 2nd edition. Palgrave, Basingstoke. (2013) ISBN 1-4039-1348-X
- Business Information Systems. 3rd edition. Red Globe Press. (2019) ISBN 978-1-352-00738-1
- Business Analysis and Design: Understanding Innovation in Organisation. Palgrave Macmillan. (2021) ISBN 978-3030679613
- Data and Society. World Scientific Publishing. (2021) ISBN 978-9811237249
