= Language model =

Statistical model of language

A language model is a computational model that predicts sequences in natural language. Language models are useful for a variety of tasks, including speech recognition, machine translation, natural language generation (generating more human-like text), optical character recognition, route optimization, handwriting recognition, grammar induction, information retrieval and disaster response.

Large language models (LLMs) are currently based on large transformers trained on large datasets (using texts scraped from the public internet, as well as any and all other text that can be obtained legally or illegally). They have superseded recurrent neural network-based models, which had previously superseded the purely statistical models, such as the word n-gram language model.

== History ==
During the 1950s, Noam Chomsky developed influential formal approaches to describing language, including models based on formal grammar.

In the 1970s, Frederick Jelinek and colleagues at IBM Research developed statistical approaches to language modeling as part of their work on speech recognition. The group used probabilistic n-gram models of word sequences and introduced perplexity as an information-theoretic measure of the uncertainty of a language model. Jelinek became a leading proponent of statistical language modeling.

Neural language models became increasingly important in the 2000s, with Yoshua Bengio and co-authors introducing a probabilistic neural network language model that learned distributed word representations while estimating the probability of word sequences.

Recurrent neural networks extended this approach by retaining information from earlier words as the sequence was processed. Tomáš Mikolov and colleagues demonstrated in 2010 that recurrent neural-network language models could substantially outperform conventional n-gram models.

== Pure statistical models ==
In 1980, the first significant statistical language model was proposed, and during the decade IBM performed 'Shannon-style' experiments, in which potential sources for language modeling improvement were identified by observing and analyzing the performance of human subjects in predicting or correcting text.

=== Models based on word n-grams ===
A word n-gram language model is a statistical model of language which calculates the probability of the next word in a sequence from a fixed size window of previous words. If one previous word is considered, it is a bigram model; if two words, a trigram model; if n − 1 words, an n-gram model.

Special tokens are introduced to denote the start and end of a sentence $\langle s\rangle$ and $\langle /s\rangle$. To prevent a zero probability being assigned to unseen words, the probability of each seen word is slightly lowered to make room for the unseen words in a given corpus. To achieve this, various smoothing methods are used, from simple "add-one" smoothing (assigning a count of 1 to unseen n-grams, as an uninformative prior) to more sophisticated techniques, such as Good–Turing discounting or back-off models.

Word n-gram models have largely been superseded by recurrent neural network–based models, which in turn have been superseded by Transformer-based models often referred to as large language models.

=== Exponential ===
Maximum entropy language models encode the relationship between a word and the n-gram history using feature functions. The equation is

$$P(w_m \mid w_1,\ldots,w_{m-1}) = \frac{1}{Z(w_1,\ldots,w_{m-1})} \exp (a^T f(w_1,\ldots,w_m))$$

where $Z(w_1,\ldots,w_{m-1})$ is the partition function, $a$ is the parameter vector, and $f(w_1,\ldots,w_m)$ is the feature function. In the simplest case, the feature function is just an indicator of the presence of a certain n-gram. It is helpful to use a prior on $a$ or some form of regularization.

The log-bilinear model is another example of an exponential language model.

=== Skip-gram model ===
1-skip-2-grams for the text "the rain in Spain falls mainly on the plain"

Skip-gram language model is an attempt at overcoming the data sparsity problem that the preceding model (i.e. word n-gram language model) faced. Words represented in an embedding vector were not necessarily consecutive anymore, but could leave gaps that are skipped over (thus the name "skip-gram").

Formally, a k-skip-n-gram is a length-n subsequence where the components occur at distance at most k from each other.

For example, in the input text:

the rain in Spain falls mainly on the plain

the set of 1-skip-2-grams includes all the bigrams (2-grams), and in addition the subsequences

the in, rain Spain, in falls, Spain mainly, falls on, mainly the, and on plain.

In skip-gram model, semantic relations between words are represented by linear combinations, capturing a form of compositionality. For example, in some such models, if v is the function that maps a word w to its n-d vector representation, then

$$v(\mathrm{king}) - v(\mathrm{male}) + v(\mathrm{female}) \approx v(\mathrm{queen})$$

where ≈ is made precise by stipulating that its right-hand side must be the nearest neighbor of the value of the left-hand side.

== Neural models ==
=== Recurrent neural network ===
Continuous representations or embeddings of words are produced in recurrent neural network-based language models (known also as continuous space language models). Such continuous space embeddings help to alleviate the curse of dimensionality, which is the consequence of the number of possible sequences of words increasing exponentially with the size of the vocabulary, further causing a data sparsity problem. Neural networks avoid this problem by representing words as non-linear combinations of weights in a neural net.

=== Large language models ===
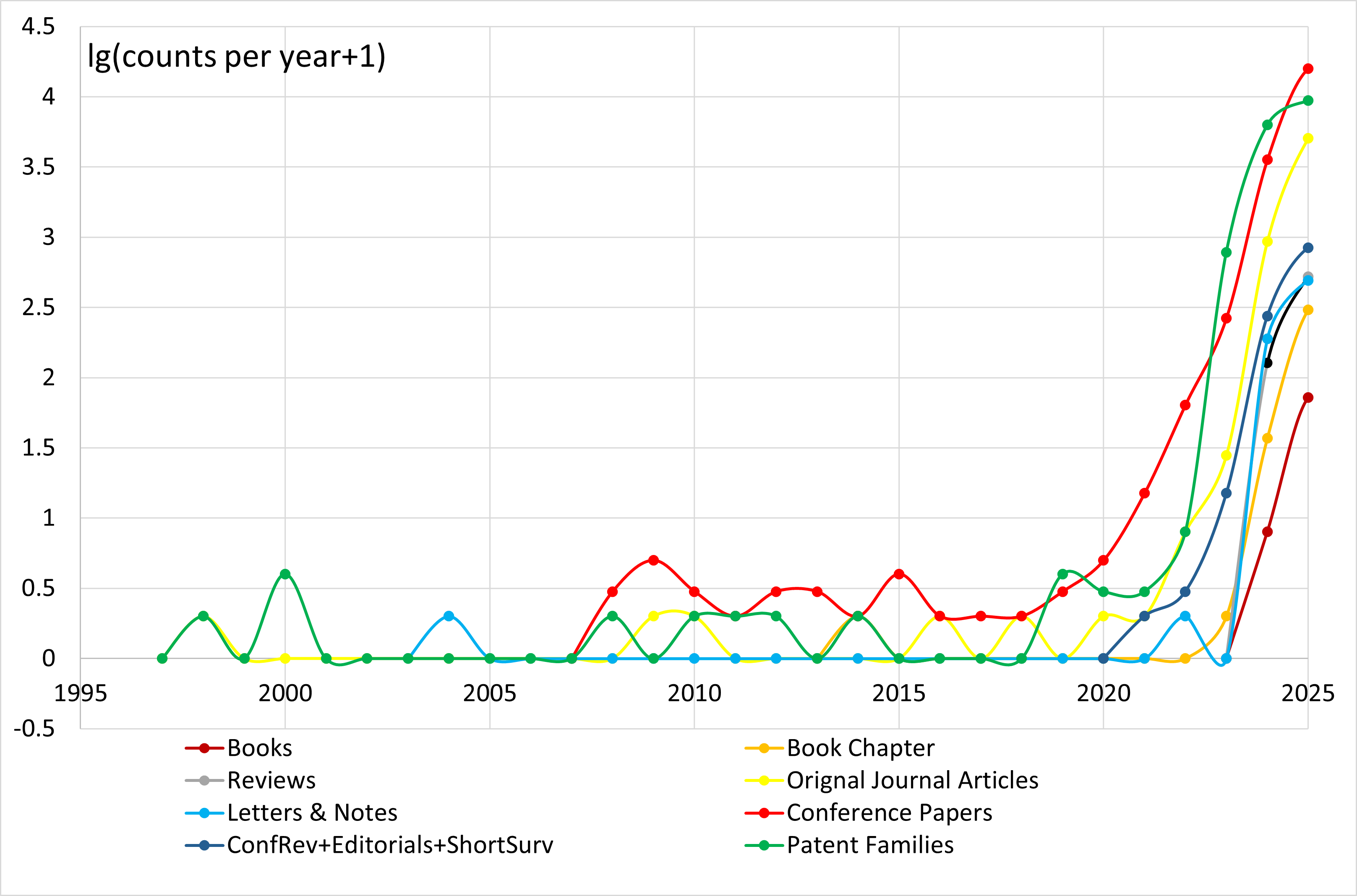
The number of publications about large language models by year grouped by publication types

A large language model (LLM) is a machine learning model (typically a neural network) trained on a vast amount of text for natural language processing tasks, especially language generation. LLMs can typically generate, summarize, translate, and analyze text in many contexts. They are the basis for many modern chatbots, such as ChatGPT, Claude, Vibe, Gemini, Grok, Qwen, DeepSeek and writing assistants such as Grammarly.

LLMs are typically based on the transformer neural network architecture. Generative pre-trained transformers (GPTs) are a type of LLM that is pre-trained to predict the next word. GPTs are then often fine-tuned to follow instructions and to behave as assistants.

Biased or inaccurate training data can make an LLM's output less reliable. A software harness can provide LLMs with memory and access to tools such as web search. Benchmark evaluations for LLMs attempt to measure model reasoning, factual accuracy, alignment, and safety.

Although sometimes matching human performance, it is not clear whether they are plausible cognitive models. At least for recurrent neural networks, it has been shown that they sometimes learn patterns that humans do not, but fail to learn patterns that humans typically do.

=== Small language models ===
Small language models (SLM) or compact language models are artificial intelligence language models designed for human natural language processing including language and text generation. Small language models typically have less than forty billion parameters. This make them feasible to train or host entirely on consumer electronics such as personal computers, laptops, or smart devices.

In contrast, a large language model typically contains hundreds of billions of training parameters, with some models exceeding a trillion parameters. This enables the model to encode vast amounts of information, improving the generalizability and accuracy of its outputs. However, training and hosting such models demands enormous computational resources, rendering it infeasible for an individual to do so using a single computer and graphics processing unit.

Most contemporary small language models use the same architecture as a large language model, but with a smaller parameter count and sometimes lower arithmetic precision. Similar to LLMs, SLMs are optimized via knowledge distillation, pruning, and quantization.

== Evaluation and benchmarks ==
Evaluation of the quality of language models is mostly done by comparison to human created sample benchmarks created from typical language-oriented tasks. Other, less established, quality tests examine the intrinsic character of a language model or compare two such models. Since language models are typically intended to be dynamic and to learn from data they see, some proposed models investigate the rate of learning, e.g., through inspection of learning curves.

Various data sets have been developed for use in evaluating language processing systems. These include:

- Massive Multitask Language Understanding (MMLU)
- Corpus of Linguistic Acceptability
- GLUE benchmark
- Microsoft Research Paraphrase Corpus
- Multi-Genre Natural Language Inference
- Question Natural Language Inference
- Quora Question Pairs
- Recognizing Textual Entailment
- Semantic Textual Similarity Benchmark
- SQuAD question answering Test
- Stanford Sentiment Treebank
- Winograd NLI
- BoolQ, PIQA, SIQA, HellaSwag, WinoGrande, ARC, OpenBookQA, NaturalQuestions, TriviaQA, RACE, BIG-bench hard, GSM8k, RealToxicityPrompts, WinoGender, CrowS-Pairs

== See also ==
- Artificial intelligence and elections
- Cache language model
- Deep linguistic processing
- Ethics of artificial intelligence
- Factored language model
- Generative pre-trained transformer
- Katz's back-off model
- Language technology
- Semantic similarity network
- Statistical model
