= PRIAM enzyme-specific profiles =

Method for the automatic detection of likely enzymes in protein sequences

PRIAM enzyme-specific profiles (PRofils pour l'Identification Automatique du Métabolisme) is a method for the automatic detection of likely enzymes in protein sequences. PRIAM uses position-specific scoring matrices (also known as profiles) automatically generated for each enzyme entry.
