= Classical definition of probability =

Concept in probability theory

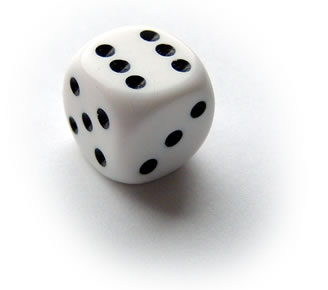
Probability with numbers on dice is the basic teaching concept in the subject

The classical definition of probability or classical interpretation of probability is identified with the works of Jacob Bernoulli and Pierre-Simon Laplace:

The probability of an event is the ratio of the number of cases favorable to it, to the number of all cases possible when nothing leads us to expect that any one of these cases should occur more than any other, which renders them, for us, equally possible.

— Laplace, Théorie analytique des probabilités

This definition is essentially a consequence of the principle of indifference. If elementary events are assigned equal probabilities, then the probability of a disjunction of elementary events is just the number of events in the disjunction divided by the total number of elementary events.

The classical definition of probability was called into question by several writers of the nineteenth century, including John Venn and George Boole. The frequentist definition of probability became widely accepted as a result of their criticism, and especially through the works of R.A. Fisher. The classical definition enjoyed a revival of sorts due to the general interest in Bayesian probability, because Bayesian methods require a prior probability distribution and the principle of indifference offers one source of such a distribution. Classical probability can offer prior probabilities that reflect ignorance which often seems appropriate before an experiment is conducted.

== History ==
As a mathematical subject, the theory of probability arose very late—as compared to geometry for example—despite the fact that we have prehistoric evidence of man playing with dice from cultures from all over the world. One of the earliest writers on probability was Gerolamo Cardano. He perhaps produced the earliest known definition of classical probability.

The sustained development of probability began in the year 1654 when Blaise Pascal had some correspondence with his father's friend Pierre de Fermat about two problems concerning games of chance he had heard from the Chevalier de Méré earlier the same year, whom Pascal happened to accompany during a trip. One problem was the so-called problem of points, a classic problem already then (treated by Luca Pacioli as early as 1494, and even earlier in an anonymous manuscript in 1400), dealing with the question how to split the money at stake in a fair way when the game at hand is interrupted half-way through. The other problem was one about a mathematical rule of thumb that seemed not to hold when extending a game of dice from using one die to two dice. This last problem, or paradox, was the discovery of Méré himself and showed, according to him, how dangerous it was to apply mathematics to reality. They discussed other mathematical-philosophical issues and paradoxes as well during the trip that Méré thought was strengthening his general philosophical view.

Pascal, in disagreement with Méré's view of mathematics as something beautiful and flawless but poorly connected to reality, determined to prove Méré wrong by solving these two problems within pure mathematics. When he learned that Fermat, already recognized as a distinguished mathematician, had reached the same conclusions, he was convinced they had solved the problems conclusively. This correspondence circulated among other scholars at the time, in particular, to Huygens, Roberval and indirectly Caramuel, and marks the starting point for when mathematicians in general began to study problems from games of chance. The correspondence did not mention "probability"; It focused on fair prices.

Half a century later, Jacob Bernoulli showed a sophisticated grasp of probability. He showed facility with permutations and combinations, discussed the concept of probability with examples beyond the classical definition (such as personal, judicial and financial decisions) and showed that probabilities could be estimated by repeated trials with uncertainty diminished as the number of trials increased.

The 1765 volume of Diderot and d'Alembert's classic Encyclopédie contains a lengthy discussion of probability and summary of knowledge up to that time. A distinction is made between probabilities "drawn from the consideration of nature itself" (physical) and probabilities "founded only on the experience in the past which can make us confidently draw conclusions for the future" (evidential).

The source of a clear and lasting definition of probability was Laplace. As late as 1814 he stated:

The theory of chance consists in reducing all the events of the same kind to a certain number of cases equally possible, that is to say, to such as we may be equally undecided about in regard to their existence, and in determining the number of cases favorable to the event whose probability is sought. The ratio of this number to that of all the cases possible is the measure of this probability, which is thus simply a fraction whose numerator is the number of favorable cases and whose denominator is the number of all the cases possible.

— Pierre-Simon Laplace, A Philosophical Essay on Probabilities

This description is what would ultimately provide the classical definition of probability. Laplace published several editions of multiple documents (technical and a popularization) on probability over a half-century span. Many of his predecessors (Cardano, Bernoulli, Bayes) published a single document posthumously.

== Criticism ==
The classical definition of probability assigns equal probabilities to events based on physical symmetry which is natural for coins, cards and dice.

- Some mathematicians object that the definition is circular. The probability for a "fair" coin is... A "fair" coin is defined by a probability of...
- The definition is very limited. It says nothing about cases where no physical symmetry exists. Insurance premiums, for example, can only be rationally priced by measured rates of loss.
- It is not trivial to justify the principle of indifference except in the simplest and most idealized of cases (an extension of the problem limited definition). Coins are not truly symmetric. Can we assign equal probabilities to each side? Can we assign equal probabilities to any real world experience?

However limiting, the definition is accompanied with substantial confidence. A casino which observes a marked departure from classical probability is confident that its assumptions have been violated (somebody is cheating). Much of the mathematics of probability was developed on the basis of this simplistic definition. Alternative interpretations of probability (for example frequentist and subjective) also have problems.

Mathematical probability theory deals in abstractions, avoiding the limitations and philosophical complications of any probability interpretation.
