= Sunrise problem =

Problem asking the probability that the sun will rise tomorrow

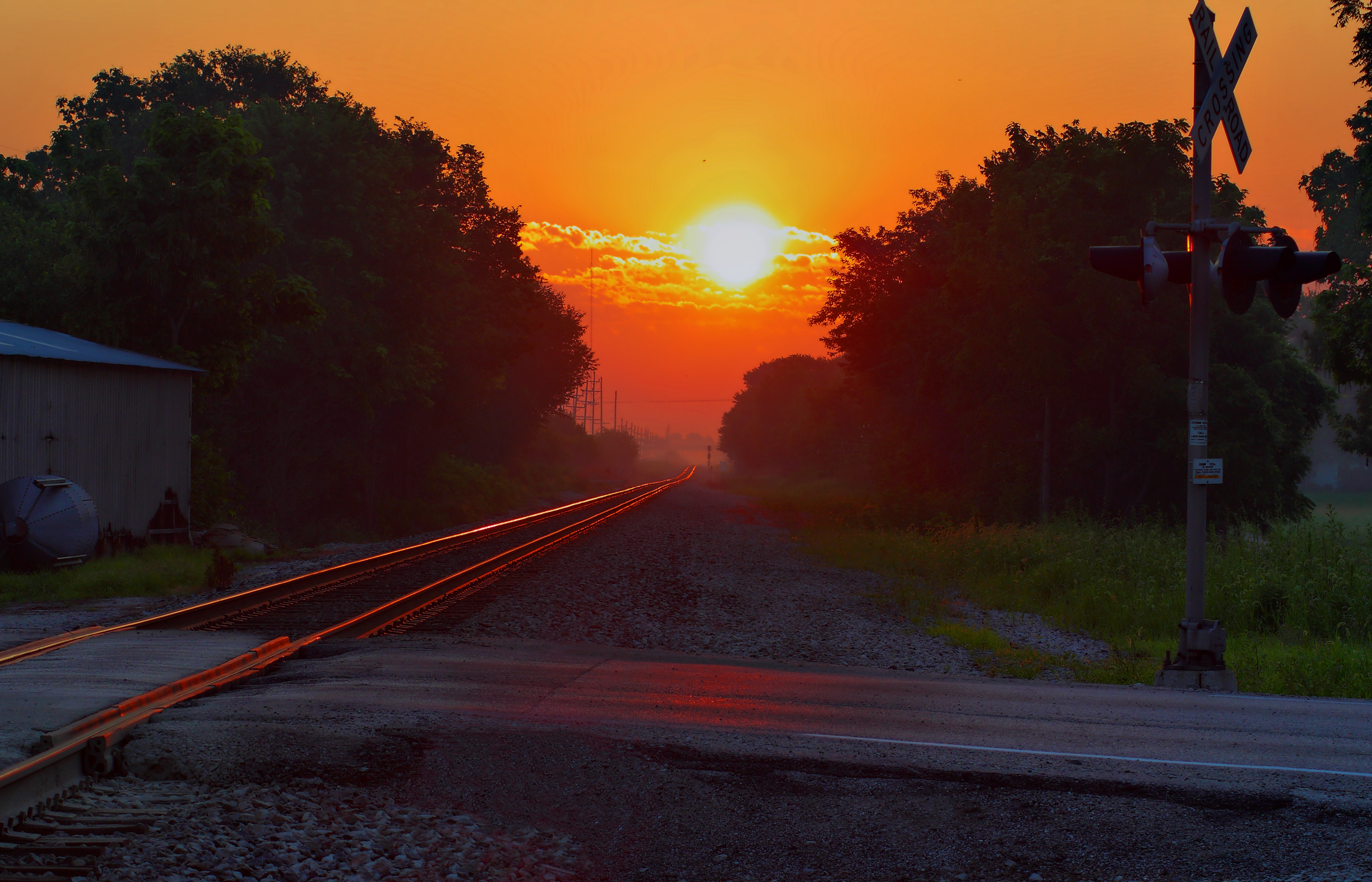
Usually inferred from repeated observations: "The sun always rises in the east".

The sunrise problem can be expressed as follows: "What is the probability that the sun will rise tomorrow?" The sunrise problem illustrates the difficulty of using probability theory when evaluating the plausibility of statements or beliefs.

According to the Bayesian interpretation of probability, probability theory can be used to evaluate the plausibility of the statement, "The sun will rise tomorrow."

The sunrise problem was first introduced publicly in 1763 by Richard Price in his famous coverage of Thomas Bayes' foundational work in Bayesianism.

== Laplace's approach ==
Pierre-Simon Laplace approached the problem by means of his rule of succession. Let p be the long-run frequency of sunrises, i.e., the sun rises on 100 × p% of days. Prior to knowing of any sunrises, one is completely ignorant of the value of p. Laplace represented this prior ignorance by means of a uniform probability distribution on p.

For instance, the probability that p is between 20% and 50% is just 30%. This must not be interpreted to mean that in 30% of all cases, p is between 20% and 50%. Rather, it means that one's state of knowledge (or ignorance) justifies one in being 30% sure that the sun rises between 20% of the time and 50% of the time. Given the value of p, and no other information relevant to the question of whether the sun will rise tomorrow, the probability that the sun will rise tomorrow is p. But we are not "given the value of p". What we are given is the observed data: the sun has risen every day on record. Laplace inferred the number of days by saying that the universe was created about 6000 years ago, based on a young-earth creationist reading of the Bible.

To find the conditional probability distribution of p given the data, one uses Bayes' theorem, which some call the Bayes–Laplace rule. Having found the conditional probability distribution of p given the data, one may then calculate the conditional probability, given the data, that the sun will rise tomorrow. That conditional probability is given by the rule of succession. The plausibility that the sun will rise tomorrow increases with the number of days on which the sun has risen so far. Specifically, assuming p has an a-priori distribution that is uniform over the interval [0,1], and that, given the value of p, the sun independently rises each day with probability p, the desired conditional probability is:

$$\Pr(\text{Sun rises tomorrow} \mid \text{It has risen } k \text{ times previously}) = \frac{\int_0^1 p^{k+1}\,dp}{\int_0^1 p^k \,dp}= \frac{k+1}{k+2}.$$

By this formula, if one has observed the sun rising 10000 times previously, the probability it rises the next day is $10001/10002 \approx 0.99990002$. Expressed as a percentage, this is approximately a $99.990002 \%$ chance.

However, Laplace recognized this to be a misapplication of the rule of succession through not taking into account all the prior information available immediately after deriving the result:

But this number [the probability of the sun coming up tomorrow] is far greater for him who, seeing in the totality of phenomena the principle regulating the days and seasons, realizes that nothing at present moment can arrest the course of it.

E.T. Jaynes noted that Laplace's warning had gone unheeded by workers in the field.

A reference class problem arises: the plausibility inferred will depend on whether we take the past experience of one person, of humanity, or of the earth. A consequence is that each referent would hold different plausibility of the statement. In Bayesianism, any probability is a conditional probability given what one knows. That varies from one person to another.

== See also ==
- Rule of succession
- Problem of induction
- Doomsday argument: a similar problem that raises intense philosophical debate
- Newcomb's paradox
- Unsolved problems in statistics
- Additive smoothing (also called Laplace smoothing)
