= ScerTF =

Content
- Description: Transcription factors and position weight matrices
- Organisms: Saccharomyces

Contact
- Research center: Washington University in St. Louis
- Laboratory: Department of Genetics
- Authors: Aaron T. Spivak
- Primary citation: Spivak & al. (2012)
- Release date: 2011

Access
- Website: https://aaronspivak.com/scertf/

ScerTF is a comprehensive database of position weight matrices for the transcription factors of Saccharomyces.

== See also ==
- Transcription factor
- Gary Stormo
