= Pignistic probability =

Probability in decision theory

In decision theory, a pignistic probability is a probability that a rational person will assign to an option when required to make a decision.

A person may have, at one level certain beliefs or a lack of knowledge, or uncertainty, about the options and their actual likelihoods. However, when it is necessary to make a decision (such as deciding whether to place a bet), the behaviour of the rational person would suggest that the person has assigned a set of regular probabilities to the options. These are the pignistic probabilities.

The term was coined by Philippe Smets, and stems from the Latin pignus, a bet. He contrasts the pignistic level, where one might take action, with the credal level, where one interprets the state of the world:

The transferable belief model is based on the assumption that beliefs manifest themselves at two mental levels: the ‘credal’ level where beliefs are entertained and the ‘pignistic’ level where beliefs are used to make decisions (from ‘credo’ I believe and ‘pignus’ a bet, both in Latin). Usually these two levels are not distinguished and probability functions are used to quantify beliefs at both levels. The justification for the use of probability functions is usually linked to “rational” behavior to be held by an ideal agent involved in some decision contexts.

A pignistic probability transform will calculate these pignistic probabilities from a structure that describes belief structures.
