= Good–Turing frequency estimation =

Statistical technique developed by Alan Turing and I. J. Good

Good–Turing frequency estimation is a statistical technique for estimating the probability of encountering an object of a hitherto unseen species, given a set of past observations of objects from different species. In drawing balls from an urn, the 'objects' would be balls and the 'species' would be the distinct colours of the balls (finite but unknown in number). After drawing $R_\text{red}$ red balls, $R_\text{black}$ black balls and $R_\text{green}$ green balls, we would ask what is the probability of drawing a red ball, a black ball, a green ball or one of a previously unseen colour.

== Historical background ==
Good–Turing frequency estimation was developed by Alan Turing and his assistant I. J. Good as part of their methods used at Bletchley Park for cracking German ciphers for the Enigma machine during World War II. Turing at first modelled the frequencies as a multinomial distribution, but found it inaccurate. Good developed smoothing algorithms to improve the estimator's accuracy.

The discovery was recognised as significant when published by Good in 1953, but the calculations were difficult so it was not used as widely as it might have been. The method even gained some literary fame due to the Robert Harris novel Enigma.

In the 1990s, Geoffrey Sampson worked with William A. Gale of AT&T to create and implement a simplified and easier-to-use variant of the Good–Turing method described below. Various heuristic justifications and a simple combinatorial derivation have been provided.

== The method ==
The Good–Turing estimator is largely independent of the distribution of species frequencies.

=== Notation ===
Suppose that $X$ distinct species have been observed, enumerated $1, \dots, X$. Then the frequency vector, $\bar{R}$, has elements $R_x$ that give the number of individuals that have been observed for species $x$. The frequency of frequencies vector, $(N_r)_{r=0, 1, \ldots}$, shows how many times the frequency $r$ occurs in the vector $\bar{R}$ (i.e., among the elements $R_x$):

$$N_r = \Bigl| \left\{ x \mid R_x = r \right\} \Bigr|.$$

For example, $N_1$ is the number of species for which only one individual was observed. Note that the total number of objects observed, $N$, can be found from

$$N = \sum_{r=1}^\infty r N_r  = \sum_{x=1}^X R_x.$$

=== Calculation ===
The first step in the calculation is to estimate the probability that a future observed individual (or the next observed individual) is a member of a thus far unseen species. This estimate is

$$p_0 = \frac{N_1}{N}.$$

The next step is to estimate the probability that the next observed individual is from a species which has been seen $r$ times. For a single species this estimate is
$$p_r = \frac{(r+1) S(N_{r+1})}{NS(N_r)}.$$
Here, the notation $S(\cdot)$ means the smoothed, or adjusted value of the frequency shown in parentheses. An overview of how to perform this smoothing follows in the next section (see also empirical Bayes method).

To estimate the probability that the next observed individual is from any species from this group (i.e., the group of species seen $r$ times) one can use the following formula:
$$\frac{(r+1) S(N_{r+1})}{N}.$$

=== Smoothing ===
For smoothing the erratic values in $N_r$ for large $r$, we would like to make a plot of $\log N_r$ versus $\log r$ but this is problematic because for large $r$ many $N_r$ will be zero. Instead a revised quantity, $\log Z_r$, is plotted versus $\log r$, where $Z_r$ is defined as

$$Z_r = \frac{N_r}{(t - q)/2},$$

and where $q$, $r$, and $t$ are three consecutive subscripts with non-zero counts $N_q$, $N_r$, $N_t$. For the special case when $r$ is 1, take $q$ to be 0. In the opposite special case, when $r = r_\text{last}$ is the index of the last non-zero count, replace the divisor $(t - q)/2$ with $r_\text{last} - q$, so $Z_{r_\text{last}} = N_{r_\text{last}} / (r_\text{last} - q)$.

A simple linear regression is then fitted to the log–log plot.

For small values of $r$ it is reasonable to set $S(N_r) = N_r$ – that is, no smoothing is performed.

For large values of $r$, values of $S(N_r)$ are read off the regression line. An automatic procedure (not described here) can be used to specify at what point the switch from no smoothing to linear smoothing should take place. Code for the method is available in the public domain.

== Derivation ==
Many different derivations of the above formula for $p_r$ have been given.

One of the simplest ways to motivate the formula is by assuming the next item will behave similarly to the previous item. The overall idea of the estimator is that currently we are seeing never-seen items at a certain frequency, seen-once items at a certain frequency, seen-twice items at a certain frequency, and so on. Our goal is to estimate just how likely each of these categories is, for the next item we will see. Put another way, we want to know the current rate at which seen-twice items are becoming seen-thrice items, and so on. Since we don't assume anything about the underlying probability distribution, it does sound a bit mysterious at first. But it is extremely easy to calculate these probabilities empirically for the previous item we saw, even assuming we don't remember exactly which item that was: Take all the items we have seen so far (including multiplicities) — the last item we saw was a random one of these, all equally likely. Specifically, the chance that we saw an item for the $(r+1)$th time is simply the chance that it was one of the items that we have now seen $r + 1$ times, namely $\frac{(r+1) N_{r+1}}{N}$. In other words, our chance of seeing an item that had been seen r times before was $\frac{(r+1) N_{r+1}}{N}$. So now we simply assume that this chance will be about the same for the next item we see. This immediately gives us the formula above for $p_0$, by setting $r=0$. And for $r>0$, to get the probability that a particular one of the $N_{r}$ items is going to be the next one seen, we need to divide this probability (of seeing some item that has been seen r times) among the $N_{r}$ possibilities for which particular item that could be. This gives us the formula $\;p_{r} = \frac{(r+1) N_{r+1}}{N N_r}$. Of course, your actual data will probably be a bit noisy, so you will want to smooth the values first to get a better estimate of how quickly the category counts are growing, and this gives the formula as shown above. This approach is in the same spirit as deriving the standard Bernoulli estimator by simply asking what the two probabilities were for the previous coin flip (after scrambling the trials seen so far), given only the current result counts, while assuming nothing about the underlying distribution.

== See also ==
- Ewens sampling formula
- Pseudocount

== Bibliography ==
- David A. McAllester, Robert Schapire (2000) On the Convergence Rate of Good–Turing Estimators, Proceedings of the Thirteenth Annual Conference on Computational Learning Theory pp. 1–6
- David A. McAllester, Ortiz, Luis (2003) Concentration Inequalities for the Missing Mass and for Histogram Rule Error, Journal of Machine Learning Research pp. 895–911
