= Law of total covariance =

Formula in probability theory

In probability theory, the law of total covariance, covariance decomposition formula, or conditional covariance formula states that if X, Y, and Z are random variables on the same probability space, and the covariance of X and Y is finite, then

$$\operatorname{cov}(X,Y)=\operatorname{E}(\operatorname{cov}(X,Y \mid Z))+\operatorname{cov}(\operatorname{E}(X\mid Z),\operatorname{E}(Y\mid Z)).$$

The nomenclature in this article's title parallels the phrase law of total variance. Some writers on probability call this the "conditional covariance formula" or use other names.

Note: The conditional expected values E( X | Z ) and E( Y | Z ) are random variables whose values depend on the value of Z. Note that the conditional expected value of X given the event Z = z is a function of z. If we write E( X | Z = z) = g(z) then the random variable E( X | Z ) is g(Z). Similar comments apply to the conditional covariance.

== Proof ==
The law of total covariance can be proved using the law of total expectation: First,

$$\operatorname{cov}(X,Y) = \operatorname{E}[XY] - \operatorname{E}[X]\operatorname{E}[Y]$$

from a simple standard identity on covariances. Then we apply the law of total expectation by conditioning on the random variable Z:

$$= \operatorname{E}\big[\operatorname{E}[XY\mid Z]\big] - \operatorname{E}\big[\operatorname{E}[X\mid Z]\big]\operatorname{E}\big[\operatorname{E}[Y\mid Z]\big]$$

Now we rewrite the term inside the first expectation using the definition of covariance:

$$= \operatorname{E}\!\big[\operatorname{cov}(X,Y\mid Z) + \operatorname{E}[X\mid Z]\operatorname{E}[Y\mid Z]\big] - \operatorname{E}\big[\operatorname{E}[X\mid Z]\big]\operatorname{E}\big[\operatorname{E}[Y\mid Z]\big]$$

Since expectation of a sum is the sum of expectations, we can regroup the terms:

$$= \operatorname{E}\!\big[\operatorname{cov}(X,Y\mid Z)\big] + \operatorname{E}\big[\operatorname{E}[X\mid Z] \operatorname{E}[Y\mid Z]\big] - \operatorname{E}\big[\operatorname{E}[X\mid Z]\big]\operatorname{E}\big[\operatorname{E}[Y\mid Z]\big]$$

Finally, we recognize the final two terms as the covariance of the conditional expectations E[X | Z] and E[Y | Z]:

$$= \operatorname{E}\big[\operatorname{cov}(X,Y \mid Z)\big]+\operatorname{cov}\big(\operatorname{E}[X\mid Z],\operatorname{E}[Y\mid Z]\big)$$

== See also ==
- Law of total variance, a special case corresponding to X = Y.
- Law of total cumulance, of which the law of total covariance is a special case.
