= Tower rule =

The tower rule may refer to one of two rules in mathematics:

- Law of total expectation, in probability and stochastic theory
- a rule governing the degree of a field extension of a field extension in field theory
