= Doob–Dynkin lemma =

Statement in probability theory

In probability theory, the Doob–Dynkin lemma, named after Joseph L. Doob and Eugene Dynkin (also known as the factorization lemma), characterizes the situation when one random variable is a function of another by the inclusion of the $\sigma$-algebras generated by the random variables. The usual statement of the lemma is formulated in terms of one random variable being measurable with respect to the $\sigma$-algebra generated by the other.

The lemma plays an important role in the conditional expectation in probability theory, where it allows replacement of the conditioning on a random variable by conditioning on the $\sigma$-algebra that is generated by the random variable.

== Notations and introductory remarks ==
In the lemma below, $\mathcal{B}[0,1]$ is the $\sigma$-algebra of Borel sets on $[0,1].$ If $T\colon X\to Y,$ and $(Y,{\mathcal Y})$ is a measurable space, then

$$\sigma(T)\ \stackrel{\text{def}}{=}\ \{T^{-1}(S)\mid S\in {\mathcal Y}\}$$

is the smallest $\sigma$-algebra on $X$ such that $T$ is $\sigma(T) / {\mathcal Y}$-measurable.

== Statement of the lemma ==
Let $T\colon \Omega\rightarrow\Omega'$ be a function, and $(\Omega',\mathcal{A}')$ a measurable space. A function $f\colon \Omega\rightarrow [0,1]$ is $\sigma(T) / \mathcal{B}[0,1]$-measurable if and only if $f=g\circ T,$ for some $\mathcal{A}' / \mathcal{B}[0,1]$-measurable $g\colon \Omega' \to [0,1].$

Remark. The "if" part simply states that the composition of two measurable functions is measurable. The "only if" part is proven below.

Proof.

Let $f$ be $\sigma(T) / \mathcal{B}[0,1]$-measurable.

First, note that, by the above descriptive definition of $\sigma(T)$ as the set of preimages of $\mathcal{A}'$-measurable sets under $T$, we know that if $A \in \sigma(T)$, then there exists some $A' \in \mathcal{A}'$ such that $A = T^{-1}(A')$.

Now, assume that $f = \mathbf{1}_A$ is an indicator of some set $A \in \sigma(T)$. If we identify $A' \in \mathcal{A}'$ such that $A = T^{-1}(A')$, then the function $g = \mathbf{1}_{A'}$ suits the requirement, and since $A \in \sigma(T)$, such a set $A' \in \mathcal{A}'$ always exists. By linearity, the claim extends to any simple measurable function $f.$

Let $f$ be measurable but not necessarily simple. As explained in the article on simple functions, $f$ is a pointwise limit of a monotonically non-decreasing sequence $f_n \geq 0$ of simple functions. The previous step guarantees that $f_n = g_n \circ T,$ for some measurable $g_n.$ The supremum $\textstyle g(x)=\sup_{ n \geq 1} g_n(x)$ exists on the entire $\Omega'$ and is measurable. (The article on measurable functions explains why supremum of a sequence of measurable functions is measurable). For every $x \in \operatorname{Im}T,$ the sequence $g_n(x)$ is non-decreasing, so $\textstyle g|_{\operatorname{Im}T}(x) = \lim_{ n \to \infty} g_n|_{\operatorname{Im}T}(x)$ which shows that $f = g \circ T.$

Remark. The lemma remains valid if the space $([0,1],\mathcal{B}[0,1])$ is replaced with $(S,\mathcal{B}(S)),$ where $S \subseteq [-\infty,\infty],$ $S$ is bijective with $[0,1],$ and the bijection is measurable in both directions.

By definition, the measurability of $f$ means that $f^{-1}(S)\in \sigma(T)$ for every Borel set $S \subseteq [0,1].$ Therefore $\sigma(f) \subseteq \sigma(T),$ and the lemma may be restated as follows.

Lemma. Let $T\colon \Omega\rightarrow\Omega',$ $f\colon \Omega\rightarrow [0,1],$ and $(\Omega',\mathcal{A}')$ be a measurable space. Then $f = g\circ T,$ for some $\mathcal{A}' / \mathcal{B}[0,1]$-measurable $g\colon \Omega' \to [0,1],$ if and only if $\sigma(f) \subseteq \sigma(T)$.

== See also ==
- Conditional expectation
