= K-distribution =

Three-parameter family of continuous probability distributions

- Parameters: $\mu \in (0, +\infty)$, $\alpha \in [0, +\infty)$, $\beta \in [0, +\infty)$
- Support: $x \in [0, +\infty)\;$
- PDF: $\frac{2}{\Gamma(\alpha)\Gamma(\beta)} \, \left( \frac{\alpha \beta}{\mu} \right)^{\frac{\alpha + \beta}{2}} \, x^{ \frac{\alpha + \beta}{2} - 1} K_{\alpha - \beta} \left( 2 \sqrt{\frac{\alpha \beta x}{\mu}} \right),$
- Mean: $\mu$
- Variance: $\mu^2 \frac{\alpha+\beta+1}{\alpha \beta}$
- MGF: $\left(\frac{\xi}{s}\right)^{\beta/2} \exp \left( \frac{\xi}{2s} \right) W_{-\delta/2,\gamma/2} \left(\frac{\xi}{s}\right)$

In probability and statistics, the generalized K-distribution is a three-parameter family of continuous probability distributions. The distribution arises by compounding two gamma distributions. In each case, a re-parametrization of the usual form of the family of gamma distributions is used, such that the parameters are:

- the mean of the distribution,
- the usual shape parameter.

K-distribution is a special case of variance-gamma distribution, which in turn is a special case of generalised hyperbolic distribution. A simpler special case of the generalized K-distribution is often referred as the K-distribution.

== Density ==
Suppose that a random variable $X$ has gamma distribution with mean $\sigma$ and shape parameter $\alpha$, with $\sigma$ being treated as a random variable having another gamma distribution, this time with mean $\mu$ and shape parameter $\beta$. The result is that $X$ has the following probability density function (pdf) for $x>0$:

$$f_X(x; \mu, \alpha, \beta)= \frac{2}{\Gamma(\alpha)\Gamma(\beta)} \, \left( \frac{\alpha \beta}{\mu} \right)^{\frac{\alpha + \beta}{2}}  \, x^{ \frac{\alpha + \beta}{2} - 1} K_{\alpha - \beta} \left( 2 \sqrt{\frac{\alpha \beta x}{\mu}} \right),$$

where $K$ is a modified Bessel function of the second kind. Note that for the modified Bessel function of the second kind, we have $K_{\nu} = K_{-\nu}$. In this derivation, the K-distribution is a compound probability distribution. It is also a product distribution: it is the distribution of the product of two independent random variables, one having a gamma distribution with mean 1 and shape parameter $\alpha$, the second having a gamma distribution with mean $\mu$ and shape parameter $\beta$.

A simpler two parameter formalization of the K-distribution can be obtained by setting $\beta = 1$ as

$$f_X(x; b, v)= \frac{2b}{\Gamma(v)} \left( \sqrt{bx} \right)^{v-1} K_{v-1} (2 \sqrt{bx} ),$$

where $v = \alpha$ is the shape factor, $b = \alpha/\mu$ is the scale factor, and $K$ is the modified Bessel function of second kind. The above two parameter formalization can also be obtained by setting $\alpha = 1$, $v = \beta$, and $b = \beta/\mu$, albeit with different physical interpretation of $b$ and $v$ parameters. This two parameter formalization is often referred to as the K-distribution, while the three parameter formalization is referred to as the generalized K-distribution.

This distribution derives from a paper by Eric Jakeman and Peter Pusey (1978) who used it to model microwave sea echo. Jakeman and Tough (1987) derived the distribution from a biased random walk model. Keith D. Ward (1981) derived the distribution from the product for two random variables, z = a y, where a has a chi distribution and y a complex Gaussian distribution. The modulus of z, |z|, then has K-distribution.

== Moments ==
The moment generating function is given by

$$M_X(s) = \left(\frac{\xi}{s}\right)^{\beta/2} \exp \left( \frac{\xi}{2s} \right) W_{-\delta/2,\gamma/2} \left(\frac{\xi}{s}\right),$$

where $\gamma = \beta - \alpha,$ $\delta = \alpha + \beta - 1,$ $\xi = \alpha \beta/\mu,$ and $W_{-\delta/2,\gamma/2}(\cdot)$ is the Whittaker function.

The n-th moments of K-distribution is given by

$$\mu_n = \xi^{-n} \frac{\Gamma(\alpha+n)\Gamma(\beta+n)}{\Gamma(\alpha)\Gamma(\beta)}.$$

So the mean and variance are given by

$$\operatorname{E}(X)= \mu$$
$$\operatorname{var}(X)= \mu^2 \frac{\alpha+\beta+1}{\alpha \beta}  .$$

== Other properties ==
All the properties of the distribution are symmetric in $\alpha$ and $\beta.$

== Applications ==
K-distribution arises as the consequence of a statistical or probabilistic model used in synthetic-aperture radar (SAR) imagery. The K-distribution is formed by compounding two separate probability distributions, one representing the radar cross-section, and the other representing speckle that is a characteristic of coherent imaging. It is also used in wireless communication to model composite fast fading and shadowing effects.

== Sources ==
- Redding, Nicholas J. (1999), Estimating the Parameters of the K Distribution in the Intensity Domain (PDF), South Australia: DSTO Electronics and Surveillance Laboratory, p. 60, DSTO-TR-0839
- Bocquet, Stephen (2011), Calculation of Radar Probability of Detection in K-Distributed Sea Clutter and Noise (PDF), Canberra, Australia: Joint Operations Division, DSTO Defence Science and Technology Organisation, p. 35, DSTO-TR-0839
- Jakeman, Eric; Pusey, Peter N. (1978-02-27). "Significance of K-Distributions in Scattering Experiments". Physical Review Letters. 40 (9). American Physical Society (APS): 546–550. Bibcode:1978PhRvL..40..546J. doi:10.1103/physrevlett.40.546. ISSN 0031-9007.
- Jakeman, Eric; Tough, Robert J. A. (1987-09-01). "Generalized K distribution: a statistical model for weak scattering". Journal of the Optical Society of America A. 4 (9). The Optical Society: 1764-1772. Bibcode:1987JOSAA...4.1764J. doi:10.1364/josaa.4.001764. ISSN 1084-7529.
- Ward, Keith D. (1981). "Compound representation of high resolution sea clutter". Electronics Letters. 17 (16). Institution of Engineering and Technology (IET): 561-565. Bibcode:1981ElL....17..561W. doi:10.1049/el:19810394. ISSN 0013-5194.
- Bithas, Petros S.; Sagias, Nikos C.; Mathiopoulos, P. Takis; Karagiannidis, George K.; Rontogiannis, Athanasios A. (2006). "On the performance analysis of digital communications over generalized-k fading channels". IEEE Communications Letters. 10 (5). Institute of Electrical and Electronics Engineers (IEEE): 353–355. CiteSeerX 10.1.1.725.7998. doi:10.1109/lcomm.2006.1633320. ISSN 1089-7798. S2CID 4044765.
- Long, Maurice W. (2001). Radar Reflectivity of Land and Sea (3rd ed.). Norwood, MA: Artech House. p. 560.
