= Convolution of probability distributions =

Probability distribution of the sum of random variables

The convolution/sum of probability distributions arises in probability theory and statistics as the operation in terms of probability distributions that corresponds to the addition of independent random variables and, by extension, to forming linear combinations of random variables. The operation here is a special case of convolution in the context of probability distributions.

== Introduction ==
The probability distribution of the sum of two or more independent random variables is the convolution of their individual distributions. The term is motivated by the fact that the probability mass function or probability density function of a sum of independent random variables is the convolution of their corresponding probability mass functions or probability density functions respectively. Many well known distributions have simple convolutions: see List of convolutions of probability distributions.

The general formula for the distribution of the sum $Z=X+Y$ of two independent integer-valued (and hence discrete) random variables is
$$\Pr(Z=z) = \sum_{k=-\infty}^\infty \Pr(X=k) \Pr(Y=z{-}k)$$

For independent, continuous random variables with probability density functions (PDF) $f,g$ and cumulative distribution functions (CDF) $F,G$ respectively, we have that the CDF of the sum is:
$$H(z)=\int_{-\infty}^\infty F(z-t)g(t) \, dt = \int_{-\infty}^\infty G(t)f(z-t) \, dt$$

If we start with random variables $X$ and $Y$, related by $Z = X + Y$, and with no information about their possible independence, then:

$$f_Z(z) = \int_{-\infty}^{\infty} f_{XY}(x, z-x)~dx$$

However, if $X$ and $Y$ are independent, then:

$$f_{XY}(x,y) = f_X(x) f_Y(y)$$

and this formula becomes the convolution of probability distributions:

$$f_Z(z) = \int_{-\infty}^{\infty} f_{X}(x)~f_Y(z-x)~dx.$$

This can equivalently be written, using the common notation for convolution, as $f_Z(z) = (f_X * f_Y)(z)$.

== Example derivation ==
There are several ways of deriving formulae for the convolution of probability distributions. Often the manipulation of integrals can be avoided by use of some type of generating function. Such methods can also be useful in deriving properties of the resulting distribution, such as moments, even if an explicit formula for the distribution itself cannot be derived.

One of the straightforward techniques is to use characteristic functions, which always exists and are unique to a given distribution.

=== Convolution of Bernoulli distributions ===
The convolution of two independent identically distributed Bernoulli random variables is a binomial random variable. That is, in a shorthand notation,
$$\sum_{i=1}^2 \mathrm{Bernoulli}(p) \sim \mathrm{Binomial}(2,p)$$

To show this let
$$X_i \sim \mathrm{Bernoulli}(p), \quad 0<p<1, \quad 1 \le i \le 2$$
and define
$$Y=\sum_{i=1}^2 X_i$$
Also, let Z denote a generic binomial random variable:
$$Z \sim \mathrm{Binomial}(2,p) \,\!$$

==== Using probability mass functions ====
As $X_1 \text{ and } X_2$ are independent,
$$\begin{align}
\Pr[Y=n] &= \Pr\left[\sum_{i=1}^2 X_i=n\right] \\
&= \sum_{m\in\mathbb{Z}} \Pr[X_1=m] \times \Pr[X_2=n{-}m] \\
&=\sum_{m\in\mathbb{Z}}\left[\binom{1}{m}p^m\left(1-p\right)^{1-m}\right]\left[\binom{1}{n-m}p^{n-m}\left(1-p\right)^{1-n+m}\right]\\
&=p^n\left(1-p\right)^{2-n}\sum_{m\in\mathbb{Z}}\binom{1}{m} \binom{1}{n-m} \\
&=p^n\left(1-p\right)^{2-n} \left[\binom{1}{0} \binom{1}{n} + \binom{1}{1} \binom{1}{n-1}\right]\\
&= \binom{2}{n}p^n\left(1-p\right)^{2-n}
= \Pr[Z=n]
\end{align}$$

Here, we used the fact that $\tbinom{n}{k}=0$ for k>n in the last but three equality, and of Pascal's rule in the second last equality.

==== Using characteristic functions ====
The characteristic function of each $X_k$ and of $Z$ is
$$\varphi_{X_k}(t)=1-p+pe^{it} \qquad \varphi_Z(t)=\left(1-p+pe^{it}\right)^2$$
where t is within some neighborhood of zero.

$$\begin{align}\varphi_Y(t)&=\operatorname{E}\left(e^{it\sum_{k=1}^2 X_k}\right)=\operatorname{E}\left(\prod_{k=1}^2 e^{itX_k}\right)\\
&=\prod_{k=1}^2 \operatorname{E}\left(e^{itX_k}\right)=\prod_{k=1}^2 \left(1-p+pe^{it}\right)\\
&=\left(1-p+pe^{it}\right)^2=\varphi_Z(t)\end{align}$$

The expectation of the product is the product of the expectations since each $X_k$ is independent. Since $Y$ and $Z$ have the same characteristic function, they must have the same distribution.

== See also ==
- List of convolutions of probability distributions
- Sum of normally distributed random variables
