= Non-commutative conditional expectation =

Generalization of conditional expectation

In mathematics, non-commutative conditional expectation is a generalization of the notion of conditional expectation in classical probability. The space of essentially bounded measurable functions on a $\sigma$-finite measure space $(X, \mu)$ is the canonical example of a commutative von Neumann algebra. For this reason, the theory of von Neumann algebras is sometimes referred to as noncommutative measure theory. The intimate connections of probability theory with measure theory suggest that one may be able to extend the classical ideas in probability to a noncommutative setting by studying those ideas on general von Neumann algebras.

For von Neumann algebras with a faithful normal tracial state, for example finite von Neumann algebras, the notion of conditional expectation is especially useful.

== Formal definition ==
Let $\mathcal{R} \subseteq \mathcal{S}$ be von Neumann algebras ($\mathcal{S}$ and $\mathcal{R}$ may be general C*-algebras as well), a positive, linear mapping $\Phi$ of $\mathcal{S}$ onto $\mathcal{R}$ is said to be a conditional expectation (of $\mathcal{S}$ onto $\mathcal{R}$) when $\Phi(I)=I$ and $\Phi(R_1SR_2) = R_1\Phi(S)R_2$ if $R_1, R_2 \in \mathcal{R}$ and $S \in \mathcal{S}$.

== Applications ==
=== Sakai's theorem ===
Let $\mathcal{B}$ be a C*-subalgebra of the C*-algebra $\mathfrak{A}, \varphi_0$ an idempotent linear mapping of $\mathfrak{A}$ onto $\mathcal{B}$ such that $\|\varphi_0\| = 1, \mathfrak{A}$ acting on $\mathcal{H}$ the universal representation of $\mathfrak{A}$. Then $\varphi_0$ extends uniquely to an ultraweakly continuous idempotent linear mapping $\varphi$ of $\mathfrak{A}^{-}$, the weak-operator closure of $\mathfrak{A}$, onto $\mathcal{B}^{-}$, the weak-operator closure of $\mathcal{B}$.

In the above setting, a result first proved by Tomiyama may be formulated in the following manner.

Theorem. Let $\mathfrak{A}, \mathcal{B}, \varphi, \varphi_0$ be as described above. Then $\varphi$ is a conditional expectation from $\mathfrak{A}^{-}$ onto $\mathcal{B}^{-}$ and $\varphi_0$ is a conditional expectation from $\mathfrak{A}$ onto $\mathcal{B}$.

With the aid of Tomiyama's theorem an elegant proof of Sakai's result on the characterization of those C*-algebras that are *-isomorphic to von Neumann algebras may be given.
