= Law of total expectation =

Proposition in probability theory

The proposition in probability theory known as the law of total expectation, the law of iterated expectations (LIE), Adam's law, the tower rule, and the smoothing property of conditional expectation, among other names, states that if $X$ is a random variable whose expected value $\operatorname{E}[X]$ is defined, and $Y$ is any random variable on the same probability space, then

$$\operatorname{E} [X] = \operatorname{E} [ \operatorname{E} [ X \mid Y]],$$

i.e., the expected value of the conditional expected value of $X$ given $Y$ is the same as the expected value of $X$.

The conditional expected value $\operatorname{E}[ X \mid Y ]$, with $Y$ a random variable, is not a simple number; it is a random variable whose value depends on the value of $Y$. That is, the conditional expected value of $X$ given the event $Y = y$ is a number and it is a function of $y$. If we write $g(y)$ for the value of $\operatorname{E} [ X \mid Y = y]$ then the random variable $\operatorname{E}[ X \mid Y ]$ is $g( Y )$.

One special case states that if ${\left\{A_i\right\}}$ is a finite or countable partition of the sample space, then

$$\operatorname{E} [X] = \sum_i{\operatorname{E}[X \mid A_i] \Pr(A_i)}.$$

== Example ==
Suppose that only two factories supply light bulbs to the market. Factory X's bulbs work for an average of 5000 hours, whereas factory Y's bulbs work for an average of 4000 hours. It is known that factory X supplies 60% of the total bulbs available. What is the expected length of time, L, that a purchased bulb will work for?

Applying the law of total expectation, we have:

$$\begin{align}
\operatorname{E} [L] &= \operatorname{E}[L \mid X] \Pr(X) + \operatorname{E}[L \mid Y] \Pr(Y) \\[3pt]
&= 5000(0.6) + 4000(0.4)\\[2pt]
&= 4600
\end{align}$$

where

- $\operatorname{E} [L]$ is the expected life of the bulb;
- $\Pr(X) = \frac{6}{10}$ is the probability that the purchased bulb was manufactured by factory $X$;
- $\Pr(Y) = \frac{4}{10}$ is the probability that the purchased bulb was manufactured by factory $Y$;
- $\operatorname{E}[L \mid X] = 5000$ is the expected lifetime of a bulb manufactured by $X$;
- $\operatorname{E}[L \mid Y] = 4000$ is the expected lifetime of a bulb manufactured by $Y$.

Thus each purchased light bulb has an expected lifetime of 4600 hours.

== Informal proof ==
When a joint probability density function is well defined and the expectations are integrable, we write for the general case
$$\begin{align}
\operatorname E[X] &= \int x \Pr[X=x] ~dx \\
\operatorname E[X\mid Y=y] &= \int x \Pr[X=x\mid Y=y] ~dx \\
\operatorname E[ \operatorname E[X\mid Y]] &= \int \left(\int x \Pr[X=x\mid Y=y] ~dx \right) \Pr[Y=y] ~dy \\
&= \iint x \Pr[X = x, Y= y] \, dx \, dy \\
&= \int x \left( \int \Pr[X = x, Y = y] \, dy \right) dx \\
&= \int x \Pr[X = x] ~dx \\
&= \operatorname E[X]\,.
\end{align}$$
A similar derivation works for discrete distributions using summation instead of integration. For the specific case of a partition, give each cell of the partition a unique label and let the random variable Y be the function of the sample space that assigns a cell's label to each point in that cell.

== Proof in the general case ==
Let $(\Omega,\mathcal{F},\Pr)$ be a probability space on which two sub σ-algebras $\mathcal{G}_1 \subseteq \mathcal{G}_2 \subseteq \mathcal{F}$ are defined. For a random variable $X$ on such a space, the smoothing law states that if $\operatorname{E}[X]$ is defined, i.e. $\min(\operatorname{E}[X_+], \operatorname{E}[X_-])<\infty$, then

$$\operatorname{E}[ \operatorname{E}[X \mid \mathcal{G}_2] \mid \mathcal{G}_1] = \operatorname{E}[X \mid \mathcal{G}_1]\quad\text{(a.s.)}.$$

Proof. Since a conditional expectation is a Radon–Nikodym derivative, verifying the following two properties establishes the smoothing law:

- $\operatorname{E}[ \operatorname{E}[X \mid \mathcal{G}_2] \mid \mathcal{G}_1] \mbox{ is } \mathcal{G}_1$-measurable
- $\int_{G_1} \operatorname{E}[ \operatorname{E}[X \mid \mathcal{G}_2] \mid \mathcal{G}_1] \, d\operatorname{P} = \int_{G_1} X \, d\operatorname{P},$ for all $G_1 \in \mathcal{G}_1.$

The first of these properties holds by definition of the conditional expectation. To prove the second one,

$$\begin{align}
\min\left(\int_{G_1}X_+\, d\operatorname{P}, \int_{G_1}X_-\, d\operatorname{P} \right) &\leq \min\left(\int_\Omega X_+\, d\operatorname{P}, \int_\Omega X_-\, d\operatorname{P}\right)\\[4pt]
&=\min(\operatorname{E}[X_+], \operatorname{E}[X_-]) < \infty,
\end{align}$$

so the integral $\int_{G_1}X\, d\operatorname{P}$ is defined (not equal $\infty - \infty$).

The second property thus holds since $G_1 \in \mathcal{G}_1 \subseteq \mathcal{G}_2$ implies
$$\int_{G_1} \operatorname{E}[ \operatorname{E}[X \mid \mathcal{G}_2] \mid \mathcal{G}_1] \, d\operatorname{P}
= \int_{G_1} \operatorname{E}[X \mid \mathcal{G}_2] \, d\operatorname{P}
= \int_{G_1} X \, d\operatorname{P}.$$

Corollary. In the special case when $\mathcal{G}_1 = \{\empty,\Omega \}$ and $\mathcal{G}_2 = \sigma(Y)$, the smoothing law reduces to
$$\operatorname{E}[ \operatorname{E}[X \mid Y]] = \operatorname{E}[X].$$

Alternative proof for $\operatorname{E}[ \operatorname{E}[X \mid Y]] = \operatorname{E}[X].$

This is a simple consequence of the measure-theoretic definition of conditional expectation. By definition, $\operatorname{E}[X \mid Y] := \operatorname{E}[X \mid \sigma(Y)]$ is a $\sigma(Y)$-measurable random variable that satisfies
$$\int_A \operatorname{E}[X \mid Y] \, d\operatorname{P} = \int_A X \, d\operatorname{P},$$
for every measurable set $A \in \sigma(Y)$. Taking $A = \Omega$ proves the claim.

== See also ==
- The fundamental theorem of poker for one practical application.
- Law of total probability
- Law of total variance
- Law of total covariance
- Law of total cumulance
- Product distribution#expectation (application of the Law for proving that the product expectation is the product of expectations)
