= Saddlepoint approximation method =

Statistical approximation method

The saddlepoint approximation method, initially proposed by Daniels (1954) is a specific example of the mathematical saddlepoint technique applied to statistics, in particular to the distribution of the sum of $N$ independent random variables. It provides a highly accurate approximation formula for any PDF or probability mass function of a distribution, based on the moment generating function. There is also a formula for the CDF of the distribution, proposed by Lugannani and Rice (1980).

== Definition ==
If the moment generating function of a random variable $X = \sum_{i=1}^{N} X_i$ is written as $M(t)=E\left[e^{tX}\right] = E\left[e^{t\sum_{i=1}^{N}X_i}\right]$ and the cumulant generating function as $K(t) = \log(M(t)) = \sum_{i=1}^{N}\log E\left[e^{tX_i}\right]$ then the saddlepoint approximation to the PDF of the distribution $X$ is defined as:

$$\hat{f}_X (x) = \frac{1}{\sqrt{2 \pi K''(\hat{s})}} \exp(K(\hat{s}) - \hat{s}x) \,\left(1+\mathcal{R}\right)$$

where $\mathcal{R}$ contains higher order terms to refine the approximation and the saddlepoint approximation to the CDF is defined as:

$$\hat{F}_X (x) = \begin{cases} \Phi(\hat{w}) + \phi(\hat{w})\left(\frac{1}{\hat{w}} - \frac{1}{\hat{u}}\right) & \text{for } x \neq \mu \\
\frac{1}{2} + \frac{K'''(0)}{6 \sqrt{2\pi} K''(0)^{3/2}} & \text{for } x = \mu
\end{cases}$$

where $\hat{s}$ is the solution to $K'(\hat{s}) = x$, $\hat{w} = \sgn{\hat{s}}\sqrt{2(\hat{s}x - K(\hat{s}))}$ ,$\hat{u} = \hat{s}\sqrt{K''(\hat{s})}$, and $\Phi(t)$ and $\phi(t)$ are the cumulative distribution function and the probability density function of a normal distribution, respectively, and $\mu$ is the mean of the random variable $X$:

$\mu \triangleq E \left[X\right] = \int_{-\infty}^{+\infty} x f_X(x) \,\text{d}x = \sum_{i=1}^{N} E \left[X_i\right]= \sum_{i=1}^{N} \int_{-\infty}^{+\infty} x_i f_{X_i}(x_i) \,\text{d}x_i$.

When the distribution is that of a sample mean, Lugannani and Rice's saddlepoint expansion for the cumulative distribution function $F(x)$ may be differentiated to obtain Daniels' saddlepoint expansion for the probability density function $f(x)$ (Routledge and Tsao, 1997). This result establishes the derivative of a truncated Lugannani and Rice series as an alternative asymptotic approximation for the density function $f(x)$. Unlike the original saddlepoint approximation for $f(x)$, this alternative approximation in general does not need to be renormalized.
