= List of convolutions of probability distributions =

In probability theory, the probability distribution of the sum of two or more independent random variables is the convolution of their individual distributions. The term is motivated by the fact that the probability mass function or probability density function of a sum of independent random variables is the convolution of their corresponding probability mass functions or probability density functions respectively. Many well known distributions have simple convolutions. The following is a list of these convolutions. Each statement is of the form

$$\sum_{i=1}^n X_i \sim Y$$

where $X_1, X_2,\dots, X_n$ are independent random variables, and $Y$ is the distribution that results from the convolution of $X_1, X_2,\dots, X_n$. In place of $X_i$ and $Y$ the names of the corresponding distributions and their parameters have been indicated.

== Discrete distributions ==
- $\sum_{i=1}^n \mathrm{Bernoulli}(p) \sim \mathrm{Binomial}(n,p) \qquad 0<p<1 \quad n=1,2,\dots$
- $\sum_{i=1}^n \mathrm{Binomial}(n_i,p) \sim \mathrm{Binomial}\left(\sum_{i=1}^n n_i,p\right) \qquad 0<p<1 \quad n_i=1,2,\dots$
- $\sum_{i=1}^n \mathrm{NegativeBinomial}(n_i,p) \sim \mathrm{NegativeBinomial}\left(\sum_{i=1}^n n_i,p\right) \qquad 0<p<1 \quad n_i=1,2,\dots$
- $\sum_{i=1}^n \mathrm{Geometric}(p) \sim \mathrm{NegativeBinomial}(n,p) \qquad 0<p<1 \quad n=1,2,\dots$
- $\sum_{i=1}^n \mathrm{Poisson}(\lambda_i) \sim \mathrm{Poisson}\left(\sum_{i=1}^n \lambda_i\right) \qquad \lambda_i>0$

== Continuous distributions ==
- $\sum_{i=1}^n \operatorname{Stable}\left(\alpha,\beta_i,c_i,\mu_i\right)=\operatorname{Stable}\left(\alpha,\frac{\sum_{i=1}^n \beta_i c_i ^\alpha}{\sum_{i=1}^n c_i^\alpha},\left( \sum_{i=1}^n c_i^\alpha \right)^{1/\alpha},\sum_{i=1}^n\mu_i\right)$

$\qquad 0<\alpha_i\le 2 \quad -1 \le \beta_i \le 1 \quad c_i>0 \quad \infty<\mu_i<\infty$

The following three statements are special cases of the above statement:

- $\sum_{i=1}^n \operatorname{Normal}(\mu_i,\sigma_i^2) \sim \operatorname{Normal}\left(\sum_{i=1}^n \mu_i, \sum_{i=1}^n \sigma_i^2\right) \qquad -\infty<\mu_i<\infty \quad \sigma_i^2>0\quad (\alpha=2, \beta_i=0)$
- $\sum_{i=1}^n \operatorname{Cauchy}(a_i,\gamma_i) \sim \operatorname{Cauchy}\left(\sum_{i=1}^n a_i, \sum_{i=1}^n \gamma_i\right) \qquad -\infty<a_i<\infty \quad \gamma_i>0 \quad (\alpha=1, \beta_i=0)$
- $\sum_{i=1}^n \operatorname{Levy}(\mu_i,c_i) \sim \operatorname{Levy}\left(\sum_{i=1}^n \mu_i, \left(\sum_{i=1}^n \sqrt{c_i}\right)^2\right) \qquad -\infty<\mu_i<\infty \quad c_i>0\quad (\alpha=1/2, \beta_i=1)$

- $\sum_{i=1}^n \operatorname{Gamma}(\alpha_i,\beta) \sim \operatorname{Gamma}\left(\sum_{i=1}^n \alpha_i,\beta\right) \qquad \alpha_i>0 \quad \beta>0$
- $\sum_{i=1}^n \operatorname{Voigt}(\mu_i,\gamma_i,\sigma_i) \sim \operatorname{Voigt}\left(\sum_{i=1}^n \mu_i,\sum_{i=1}^n \gamma_i,\sqrt{\sum_{i=1}^n \sigma_i^2}\right) \qquad -\infty<\mu_i<\infty \quad \gamma_i>0 \quad \sigma_i>0$
- $\sum_{i=1}^n \operatorname{VarianceGamma}(\mu_i,\alpha,\beta,\lambda_i) \sim \operatorname{VarianceGamma}\left(\sum_{i=1}^n \mu_i, \alpha,\beta, \sum_{i=1}^n \lambda_i\right) \qquad -\infty<\mu_i<\infty \quad \lambda_i > 0 \quad \sqrt{\alpha^2 - \beta^2} > 0$
- $\sum_{i=1}^n \operatorname{Exponential}(\theta) \sim \operatorname{Erlang}(n,\theta) \qquad \theta>0 \quad n=1,2,\dots$
- $\sum_{i=1}^n \operatorname{Exponential}(\lambda_i) \sim \operatorname{Hypoexponential}(\lambda_1,\dots,\lambda_n) \qquad \lambda_i>0$
- $\sum_{i=1}^n \chi^2(r_i) \sim \chi^2\left(\sum_{i=1}^n r_i\right) \qquad r_i=1,2,\dots$
- $\sum_{i=1}^r N^2(0,1) \sim \chi^2_r \qquad r=1,2,\dots$
- $\sum_{i=1}^n(X_i - \bar X)^2 \sim \sigma^2 \chi^2_{n-1}, \quad$ where $X_1,\dots,X_n$ is a random sample from $N(\mu,\sigma^2)$ and $\bar X = \frac{1}{n} \sum_{i=1}^n X_i.$

Mixed distributions:

- $\operatorname{Normal}(\mu,\sigma^2)+\operatorname{Cauchy}(x_0,\gamma) \sim \operatorname{Voigt}(\mu+x_0,\sigma,\gamma)\qquad -\infty<\mu<\infty \quad -\infty<x_0<\infty \quad \gamma>0 \quad \sigma>0$

== See also ==
- Algebra of random variables
- Relationships among probability distributions
- Infinite divisibility (probability)
- Bernoulli distribution
- Binomial distribution
- Cauchy distribution
- Convolution of probability distributions
- Erlang distribution
- Exponential distribution
- Gamma distribution
- Geometric distribution
- Hypoexponential distribution
- Lévy distribution
- Poisson distribution
- Stable distribution
- Mixture distribution
- Sum of normally distributed random variables

== Sources ==
- Hogg, Robert V.; McKean, Joseph W.; Craig, Allen T. (2004). Introduction to mathematical statistics (6th ed.). Upper Saddle River, New Jersey: Prentice Hall. p. 692. ISBN 978-0-13-008507-8. MR 0467974.
