= Credibility theory =

Branch of actuarial mathematics

Credibility theory is a branch of actuarial mathematics concerned with determining risk premiums. To achieve this, it uses mathematical models in an effort to forecast the (expected) number of insurance claims based on past observations. Technically speaking, the problem is to find the best linear approximation to the mean of the Bayesian predictive density, which is why credibility theory has many results in common with linear filtering as well as Bayesian statistics more broadly.

Credibility theory is applied in order to determine how to weigh a less certain estimate of risk for a subgroup against a more certain estimate for the overall population. The resulting estimate is $\hat{\mu}(\theta) = z\bar{x} + (1-z)\mu$ where $\theta$ is a parameter representing the risk of the subgroup, $\bar{x}$ is the experience of the subgroup (e.g., number of claims, average loss per exposure, etc., depending on the application), and $z$ is the credibility factor representing the relative weight.

For example, an actuary has an accident and payroll historical data for a shoe factory suggesting a rate of 3.1 accidents per million dollars of payroll. She has industry statistics (based on all shoe factories) suggesting that the rate is 7.4 accidents per million. With a credibility, $z$, of 30%, she would estimate the rate for the factory as 0.3 × 3.1 + 0.7 × 7.4 = 6.1 accidents per million and set the premium accordingly.

Setting rates with a credibility factor of zero would result in charging a premium based on the overall risk to every subscriber. Less risky subscribers would be overcharged, possibly taking their business elsewhere, while the remaining riskier subscribers would be undercharged, a form of adverse selection. A credibility factor of one results in charging every subscriber whatever premium is implied by their specific experience, risking overfitting, especially with small samples. Using intermediate values is reasonable to the extent that the past experience of both the subgroup and overall population are relevant to the future experience of the subgroup.

== Types of credibility ==
=== Bühlmann credibility ===
Bühlmann credibility calculates the credibility factor by comparing the variance associated with the experience of the subgroup (the expected value of the process variance, abbreviated EPV) with the heterogeneity of the overall population (the variance of the hypothetical means or VHM). If $n$ is the number of exposures involved in the subgroup experience, the credibility factor is then
$$z = \frac{VHM}{VHM + EPV/n}$$

For example, suppose a certain basketball team always scores either 128 or 130 points in each game, and that these scores are quite high compared to other teams in their league. This team has very little variance in their scores, so they will contribute very little to the EPV. Also, their unusually high point totals greatly increase the variance of the overall population, so they contribute a lot to the VHM. Applying Bühlmann credibility to our estimate of this team's future scoring will result in a credibility factor close to one. By contrast, a team with very typical scoring relative to their league would receive a credibility factor close to zero.

Bühlmann credibility can be seen as an approximation to a Bayesian posterior mean. When the posterior mean is linear in the past experience, the approximation is exact, and these situations are called exact credibility.
