= Ratio distribution =

Probability distribution

A ratio distribution (also known as a quotient distribution) is a probability distribution constructed as the distribution of the ratio (or quotient) of random variables having two other known distributions. Given two (usually independent) random variables X and Y, the distribution of the random variable Z that is formed as the ratio Z = X/Y is a ratio distribution.

An example is the Cauchy distribution (also called the normal ratio distribution), which comes about as the ratio of two normally distributed variables with zero mean. Two other distributions often used in test-statistics are also ratio distributions: Student's t-distribution arises from a Gaussian random variable divided by an independent chi-distributed random variable, while the F-distribution originates from the ratio of two independent chi-squared distributed random variables. More general ratio distributions have been considered in the literature.

Often the ratio distributions are heavy-tailed, and it may be difficult to work with such distributions and develop an associated statistical test. A method based on the median has been suggested as a "work-around".

== Algebra of random variables ==
The ratio is one type of algebra for random variables: Related to the ratio distribution are the product distribution, sum distribution and difference distribution. More generally, one may talk of combinations of sums, differences, products and ratios. Many of these distributions are described in Melvin D. Springer's book from 1979 The Algebra of Random Variables.

The algebraic rules known with ordinary numbers do not apply for the algebra of random variables. For example, if a product is $C=AB$ and a ratio is $D=C/A$ it does not necessarily mean that the distributions of $D$ and $B$ are the same. Indeed, a peculiar effect is seen for the Cauchy distribution: The product and the ratio of two independent Cauchy distributions (with the same scale parameter and the location parameter set to zero) will give the same distribution. This becomes evident when regarding the Cauchy distribution as itself a ratio distribution of two Gaussian distributions of zero means: Consider two Cauchy random variables, $C_1$ and $C_2$, each constructed from two Gaussian distributions $C_1=G_1/G_2$ and $C_2 = G_3/G_4$. Then
$$\frac{C_1}{C_2} = \frac{{G_1}/{G_2}}{{G_3}/{G_4}} = \frac{G_1 G_4}{G_2 G_3} = \frac{G_1}{G_2} \times \frac{G_4}{G_3} = C_1 \times C_3,$$
where $C_3 = G_4/G_3$. The first term is the ratio of two Cauchy distributions while the last term is the product of two such distributions.

== Derivation ==
A way of deriving the ratio distribution of $Z=X/Y$ from the joint distribution of the two other random variables $X$, $Y$, with joint PDF $p_{X,Y}(x,y)$, is by integration of the following form
$$p_Z(z) = \int^{+\infty}_{-\infty} |y|\, p_{X,Y}(zy, y) \, dy.$$

If the two variables are independent then $p_{XY}(x,y) = p_X(x) p_Y(y)$ and this becomes
$$p_Z(z) = \int^{+\infty}_{-\infty} |y|\, p_X(zy) p_Y(y) \, dy.$$

This may not be straightforward. By way of example take the classical problem of the ratio of two standard Gaussian samples. The joint PDF is
$$p_{X,Y}(x,y) = \frac {1}{2 \pi }\exp\left(-\frac{x^2}{2} \right) \exp \left(-\frac{y^2}{2} \right).$$

Defining $Z = X/Y$ we have
$$\begin{align}
p_Z(z) &=  \frac {1}{2 \pi }\int_{-\infty}^{\infty} \, |y| \, \exp\left(-\frac{\left(zy\right)^2}{2} \right) \, \exp\left(-\frac{  y^2}{2} \right) \, dy \\
&= \frac {1}{2 \pi } \int_{-\infty}^{\infty}  \,|y| \, \exp\left(-\frac{y^2 \left(z^2 + 1\right)}{2} \right) \, dy.
\end{align}$$
Using the known definite integral $\int_0^{\infty} x \exp\left(-cx^2 \right) dx = \frac {1}{2c}$ we get
$$p_Z(z) = \frac {1}{\pi (z^2 + 1)},$$
which is the Cauchy distribution, or [[Student's t-distribution|Student's t-distribution]] with $n = 1$.

The Mellin transform has also been suggested for derivation of ratio distributions.

In the case of positive independent variables, proceed as follows. The diagram shows a separable bivariate distribution $f_{x,y}(x,y)=f_x(x)f_y(y)$ which has support in the positive quadrant $x,y > 0$ and we wish to find the pdf of the ratio $R= X/Y$. The hatched volume above the line $y=x/R$ represents the cumulative distribution of the function $f_{x,y}(x,y)$ multiplied with the logical function $X/Y\le R$. The density is first integrated in horizontal strips; the horizontal strip at height $y$ extends from $x=0$ to $x=Ry$ and has incremental probability $f_y(y)dy \int_0^{Ry} f_x(x)dx$.

Secondly, integrating the horizontal strips upward over all $y$ yields the volume of probability above the line
$$F_R(R) = \int_0^\infty f_y(y) \left(\int_0^{Ry} f_x(x)dx \right) dy$$
Finally, differentiate $F_R(R)$ with respect to $R$ to get the PDF $f_R(R)$.
$$f_R(R) = \frac{d}{dR} \left[ \int_0^\infty f_y(y) \left(\int_0^{Ry} f_x(x)dx \right) dy \right]$$
Move the differentiation inside the integral:
$$f_R(R) = \int_0^\infty f_y(y) \left(\frac{d}{dR} \int_0^{Ry} f_x(x)dx \right) dy$$
and since
$$\frac{d}{dR} \int_0^{Ry} f_x(x)dx  = yf_x(Ry)$$
then
$$f_R(R) = \int_0^\infty f_y(y) f_x(Ry) y dy.$$
As an example, find the PDF of the ratio $R$ when
$$\begin{align}
f_x(x) &= \alpha e^{-\alpha x}, \\
f_y(y) &= \beta e^{-\beta y}, \\
x,y &\ge 0.
\end{align}$$

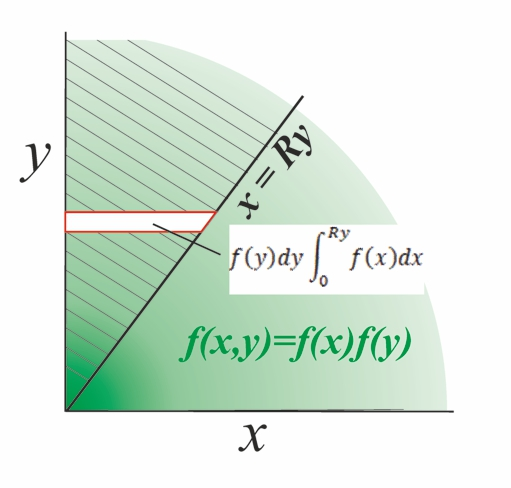
Evaluating the cumulative distribution of a ratio

We have
$$\int_0^{Ry} f_x(x)dx = - \left.e^{-\alpha x} \right\vert_0^{Ry} =  1- e^{-\alpha Ry}$$
thus
$$\begin{align} F_R(R) &= \int_0^\infty f_y(y) \left( 1- e^{-\alpha Ry} \right) dy \\
&=\int_0^\infty \beta e^{-\beta y} \left( 1- e^{-\alpha Ry} \right) dy \\
& = 1 - \frac{\alpha R}{\beta + \alpha R} \\
& = \frac{ R}{\tfrac{\beta}{\alpha} +  R}.
\end{align}$$
Differentiation with respect to $R$ yields the PDF of $R$:
$$f_R(R) =\frac{d}{dR} \left(\frac{ R}{\tfrac{\beta}{\alpha} + R}\right) = \frac{\tfrac{\beta}{\alpha}}{\left(\tfrac{\beta}{\alpha} + R \right)^2}.$$

== Moments of random ratios ==
From Mellin transform theory, for distributions existing only on the positive half-line $x \ge 0$, we have the product identity
$$\operatorname{E}[(UV)^p] = \operatorname{E}[U^p ] \cdot \operatorname{E}[V^p]$$
provided $U$, $V$ are independent. For the case of a ratio of samples like $\operatorname{E}[(X/Y)^p]$, in order to make use of this identity it is necessary to use moments of the inverse distribution. Set $1/Y = Z$ such that $\operatorname{E}[(XZ)^p] = \operatorname{E}[X^p] \cdot \operatorname{E}[Y^{-p}]$. Thus, if the moments of $X^p$ and $Y^{-p}$ can be determined separately, then the moments of $X/Y$ can be found. The moments of $Y^{-p}$ are determined from the inverse PDF of $Y$, often a tractable exercise. At simplest, $\textstyle \operatorname{E}[Y^{-p}] = \int_0^\infty y^{-p} f_y(y)dy$.

To illustrate, let $X$ be sampled from a standard Gamma distribution
$$x^{\alpha - 1}e^{-x}/\Gamma(\alpha)$$
whose $p$-th moment is $\Gamma(\alpha + p) / \Gamma(\alpha)$.

$Z = Y^{-1}$ is sampled from an inverse Gamma distribution with parameter $\beta$ and has PDF $\Gamma^{-1}(\beta) z^{-(1+\beta)} e^{-1/z}$. The moments of this PDF are
$$\operatorname{E}[Z^p]= \operatorname{E}[Y^{-p}] = \frac { \Gamma(\beta - p)}{ \Gamma(\beta) }, \; p<\beta.$$

Multiplying the corresponding moments gives
$$\operatorname{E}[(X/Y)^p]=\operatorname{E}[X^p] \cdot \operatorname{E}[Y^{-p}] = \frac { \Gamma(\alpha + p)}{ \Gamma(\alpha) } \frac { \Gamma(\beta - p)}{ \Gamma(\beta) }, \; p<\beta.$$

Independently, it is known that the ratio of the two Gamma samples $R = X/Y$ follows the beta prime distribution:
$$f_{\beta'}(r, \alpha, \beta) = \Beta(\alpha, \beta)^{-1} r^{\alpha-1} (1+r)^{-(\alpha + \beta)}$$
whose moments are
$$\operatorname{E}[R^p]= \frac { \Beta(\alpha + p,\beta-p)}{ \Beta(\alpha, \beta)}.$$

Substituting $\Beta(\alpha, \beta) =\frac { \Gamma(\alpha)\Gamma(\beta)}{ \Gamma(\alpha +\beta) }$ we have
$$\begin{align}
\operatorname{E}[R^p] &= \left.\frac {\Gamma(\alpha + p)\Gamma(\beta - p)}{\Gamma(\alpha +\beta)} \right/ \frac{\Gamma(\alpha)\Gamma(\beta)}{\Gamma(\alpha +\beta)} \\[.5em]
&= \frac{\Gamma(\alpha +p)\Gamma(\beta - p)}{\Gamma(\alpha) \Gamma(\beta) },
\end{align}$$
which is consistent with the product of moments above.

== Means and variances of random ratios ==
In the Product distribution section, and derived from Mellin transform theory (see section above), it is found that the mean of a product of independent variables is equal to the product of their means. In the case of ratios, we have
$$\operatorname{E}(X/Y) = \operatorname{E}(X) \cdot \operatorname{E}(1/Y)$$
which, in terms of probability distributions, is equivalent to
$$\operatorname{E}(X/Y) = \int_{-\infty}^\infty x f_x(x) \, dx  \times \int_{-\infty}^\infty y^{-1} f_y(y) \, dy.$$

Note that $\textstyle \operatorname{E}(1/Y) \neq \frac{1}{\operatorname{E}(Y)}$; i.e., $\textstyle \int_{-\infty}^\infty y^{-1} f_y(y) \, dy \ne 1\left/\int_{-\infty}^\infty y f_y(y) \, dy\right.$.

The variance of a ratio of independent variables is
$$\begin{align}
\operatorname{Var}(X/Y) &= \operatorname{E}([X/Y]^2) - \operatorname{E^2}(X/Y) \\
&= \operatorname{E}(X^2) \cdot \operatorname{E}(1/Y^2) - \operatorname{E}^2(X) \cdot \operatorname{E}^2(1/Y).
\end{align}$$

== Normal ratio distributions ==
=== Uncorrelated central normal ratio ===
When $X$ and $Y$ are independent and have a Gaussian distribution with zero mean, the form of their ratio distribution is a Cauchy distribution. This can be derived by setting $Z=X/Y = \tan \theta$, then showing that $\theta$ has circular symmetry. For a bivariate uncorrelated Gaussian distribution we have
$$\begin{align}
p(x,y) &= \frac{1}{\sqrt {2 \pi} } \exp{\left(-\tfrac{x^2}{2}\right)} \times \frac{1}{\sqrt {2\pi}}\exp{\left(-\tfrac{y^2}{2}\right)} \\
&= \frac{1}{2\pi} \exp{\left(-\tfrac{x^2 + y^2}{2}\right)} \\
&= \frac{1}{2\pi} \exp{\left(-\frac{r^2}{2}\right)},\ \text{for}\ r^2 = x^2 + y^2.
\end{align}$$

If $p(x,y)$ is a function only of $r$, then $\theta$ is uniformly distributed on $[0, 2\pi]$ with density $\textstyle \frac{1}{2\pi}$, so the problem reduces to finding the probability distribution of $Z$ under the mapping
$$Z = X/Y = \tan \theta.$$

We have, by conservation of probability
$$p_z(z) \,|dz| = p_\theta(\theta) \,|d\theta|,$$
and since $\textstyle \frac{dz}{d\theta} = \frac{1}{\cos^2 \theta}$,
$$p_z(z) = \frac{p_\theta(\theta)}{\left|\frac{dz}{d\theta}\right|} = \frac{1}{2\pi}{\cos^2 \theta}.$$
Setting
$$\cos^2 \theta = \frac{1}{1 + (\tan\theta)^2} = \frac{1}{1 + z^2},$$
we get
$$p_z(z) = \frac{1/(2\pi)}{1 + z^2}.$$
There is a spurious factor of 2 here. Actually, two values of $\theta$ spaced by $\pi$ map onto the same value of $z$, the density is doubled, and the final result is
$$p_z(z) = \frac{1/\pi}{1 + z^2 }, \quad -\infty < z < \infty.$$

When either of the two normal distributions is non-central, then the result for the distribution of the ratio is much more complicated and is given below in the succinct form presented by David Hinkley. The trigonometric method for a ratio does, however, extend to radial distributions like bivariate normals or a bivariate [[Student's t-distribution|Student's t-distribution]], in which the density depends only on radius $r = \sqrt{x^2 + y^2}$. It does not extend to the ratio of two independent Student's t-distributions, which give the Cauchy ratio shown in a section below for one degree of freedom.

=== Uncorrelated noncentral normal ratio ===
In the absence of correlation ($\operatorname{cor}(X,Y)=0$), the probability density function of the ratio $Z = X/Y$ of two normal variables $X = \mathcal{N}(\mu_X, \sigma_X^2)$ and $Y = \mathcal{N}(\mu_Y, \sigma_Y^2)$ is given exactly by the following expression, derived in several sources:
$$p_Z(z) = \frac{e^{-c/2}}{a^2(z) \cdot 2 \pi \sigma_x \sigma_y} \left(\sqrt{2 \pi } \frac{b(z)}{a(z)} \exp \left(\frac{b^2(z)}{2a^2(z)} \right) \mathrm{erf} \left(\frac{b(z)}{\sqrt{2} a(z)} \right) + 2 \right),$$
where
$$\begin{align}
a(z) &= \sqrt{\frac{1}{\sigma_x^2} z^2 + \frac{1}{\sigma_y^2}}, \\
b(z) &= \frac{\mu_x }{\sigma_x^2} z + \frac{\mu_y}{\sigma_y^2}, \\
c    &= \frac{\mu_x^2}{\sigma_x^2} + \frac{\mu_y^2}{\sigma_y^2}.
\end{align}$$

Under several assumptions (usually fulfilled in practical applications), it is possible to derive a highly accurate solid approximation to the PDF. Main benefits include reduced formulae complexity, closed-form CDF, simple defined median, and well defined error management. For the sake of simplicity introduce parameters: $\textstyle p = \frac{\mu_x}{\sqrt{2}\sigma_x}$, $\textstyle q =\frac{\mu_y}{\sqrt{2}\sigma_y}$, and $\textstyle r = \frac{\mu_x}{\mu_y}$. Then the so-called solid approximation $p_Z^\dagger(z)$ to the uncorrelated noncentral normal ratio PDF is expressed by equation
$$p_Z^\dagger(z)=\frac{1}{\sqrt{\pi}} \frac{p}{\mathrm{erf}[q]} \frac{1}{r} \frac{1+\frac{p^2}{q^2}\frac{z}{r}}{\left(1+\frac{p^2}{q^2}\left[\frac{z}{r}\right]^2\right)^\frac{3}{2}} \exp\left({-\frac{p^2\left(\frac{z}{r}-1 \right)^2}{1+\frac{p^2}{q^2}\left[\frac{z}{r}\right]^2}}\right).$$

Under certain conditions, a normal approximation is possible, with variance:
$$\sigma_z^2=\frac{\mu_x^2}{\mu_y^2} \left(\frac{\sigma_x^2}{\mu_x^2} + \frac{\sigma_y^2}{\mu_y^2}\right).$$

=== Correlated central normal ratio ===
The above expression becomes more complicated when the variables $X$ and $Y$ are correlated. If $\mu_x =$ $\mu_y = 0$ but $\sigma_X \neq \sigma_Y$ and $\rho \neq 0$, the more general Cauchy distribution is obtained,
$$p_Z(z) = \frac{1}{\pi} \frac{\beta}{(z-\alpha)^2 + \beta^2},$$
where $\rho$ is the correlation coefficient between $X$ and $Y$, and
$$\begin{align}
\alpha &= \rho \frac{\sigma_x}{\sigma_y}, \\
\beta  &= \frac{\sigma_x}{\sigma_y} \sqrt{1-\rho^2}.
\end{align}$$

The complex distribution has also been expressed with Kummer's confluent hypergeometric function or the Hermite function.

=== Correlated noncentral normal ratio ===
This was shown in Springer.

A transformation to the log domain was suggested by Katz. Let the ratio be
$$T \sim \frac{\mu_x + \mathcal{N}(0, \sigma_x^2 )}{\mu_y + \mathcal{N}(0, \sigma_y^2 )}
= \frac{\mu_x + X}{\mu_y + Y}
= \frac{\mu_x}{\mu_y}\frac{1+ \frac{X}{\mu_x}}{1+ \frac{Y}{\mu_y}}.$$

Take the logarithm of both sides to get
$$\ln(T) = \ln \left(\frac{\mu_x}{\mu_y} \right)
+ \ln \left( 1+ \frac{X}{\mu_x} \right)
- \ln \left( 1+ \frac{Y}{\mu_y} \right).$$
Observing that $\ln(1+\delta) = \delta - \frac{\delta^2}{2} + \frac{\delta^3}{3} + \cdots$, then asymptotically
$$\begin{align}
\ln(T) &\approx \ln \left(\frac{\mu_x}{\mu_y} \right)+ \frac{X}{\mu_x} - \frac{Y}{\mu_y} \\
&\sim \ln \left(\frac{\mu_x}{\mu_y} \right) + \mathcal{N} \left( 0, \frac{\sigma_x^2}{\mu_x^2} + \frac{\sigma_y^2}{\mu_y^2} - 2 \frac{\operatorname{Cov}(X,Y)}{\mu_x \mu_y} \right).
\end{align}$$

Alternatively, Geary suggested in 1930 that
$$t \approx \frac{\mu_y T - \mu_x}{\sqrt{\sigma_y^2 T^2 - 2\rho \sigma_x \sigma_y T + \sigma_x^2}}$$
has approximately a standard Gaussian distribution; This transformation has been called the Geary–Hinkley transformation. The approximation is good if $Y$ is unlikely to assume negative values, i.e., $\textstyle \mu_y > 3\sigma_y$.

==== Exact correlated noncentral normal ratio ====
This is developed by Springer and Hinkley. Geary showed how the correlated ratio $z$ could be transformed into a near-Gaussian form and developed an approximation for $t$ dependent on the probability of negative denominator values $x + \mu_x < 0$ being vanishingly small. Fieller's later correlated ratio analysis is exact but care is needed when combining modern math packages with verbal conditions in the older literature. Pham-Ghia has exhaustively discussed these methods. Hinkley's correlated results are exact but it is shown below that the correlated ratio condition can also be transformed into an uncorrelated one so only the simplified Hinkley equations above are required, not the full correlated ratio version.

Let the ratio be:
$$z=\frac {x+\mu_x}{y+\mu_y}$$
in which $x, y$ are zero-mean correlated normal variables with variances $\sigma_x^2, \sigma_y^2$ and $X, Y$ have means $\mu_x, \mu_y$. Write $x'=x-\rho y\tfrac{\sigma_x}{\sigma_y}$ such that $x', y$ become uncorrelated and $x'$ has standard deviation $\textstyle \sigma_x' = \sigma_x \sqrt {1- \rho^2}$. Then the ratio
$$z = \frac{x' + \rho y\tfrac{\sigma_x}{\sigma_y}+\mu_x}{y+\mu_y}$$
is invariant under this transformation and retains the same PDF.

The $y$ term in the numerator appears to be made separable by expanding
$${x' + \rho y \tfrac{\sigma_x}{\sigma_y} +\mu_x} = x'+\mu_x -\rho \mu_y \tfrac{\sigma_x}{\sigma_y} + \rho (y+\mu_y)\tfrac{\sigma_x}{\sigma_y}$$
to get
$$z=\frac {x'+\mu_x'}{y+\mu_y} + \rho \frac{ \sigma_x}{\sigma_y}$$
in which $\mu'_x=\mu_x - \rho \mu_y \frac { \sigma_x }{\sigma_y}$ and $z$ has now become a ratio of uncorrelated non-central normal samples with an invariant $z$-offset. (Note: This is not formally proven, though appears to have been used by Geary)

Finally, to be explicit, the PDF of the ratio $z$ for correlated variables is found by inputting the modified parameters $\sigma_x', \mu_x'$, $\sigma_y, \mu_y$ and $\rho' = 0$ into the Hinkley equation above which returns the PDF for the correlated ratio with a constant offset $\textstyle -\rho\tfrac{\sigma_x}{\sigma_y}$ on $z$.

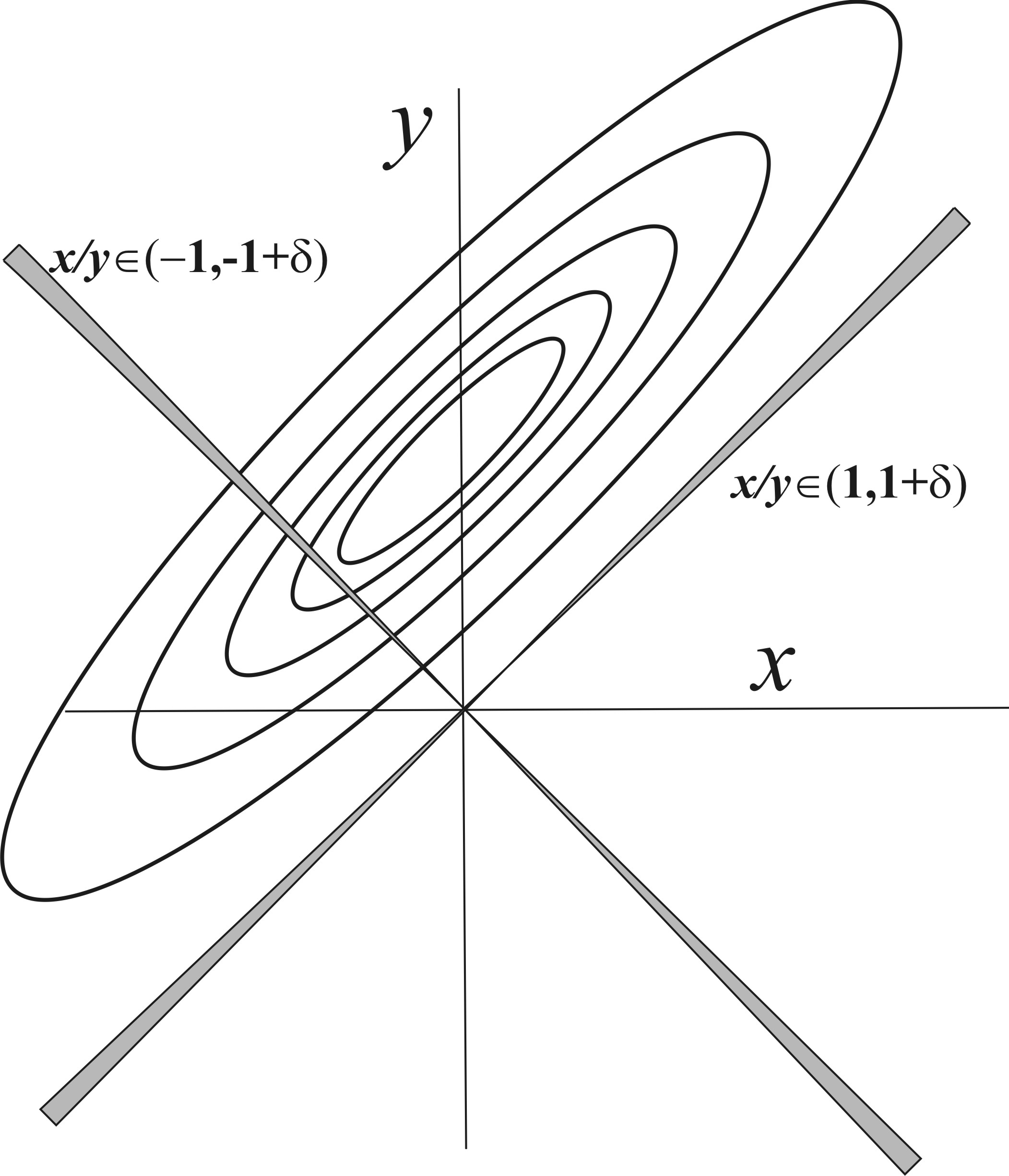
Contours of the correlated bivariate Gaussian distribution (not to scale) giving ratio x/y

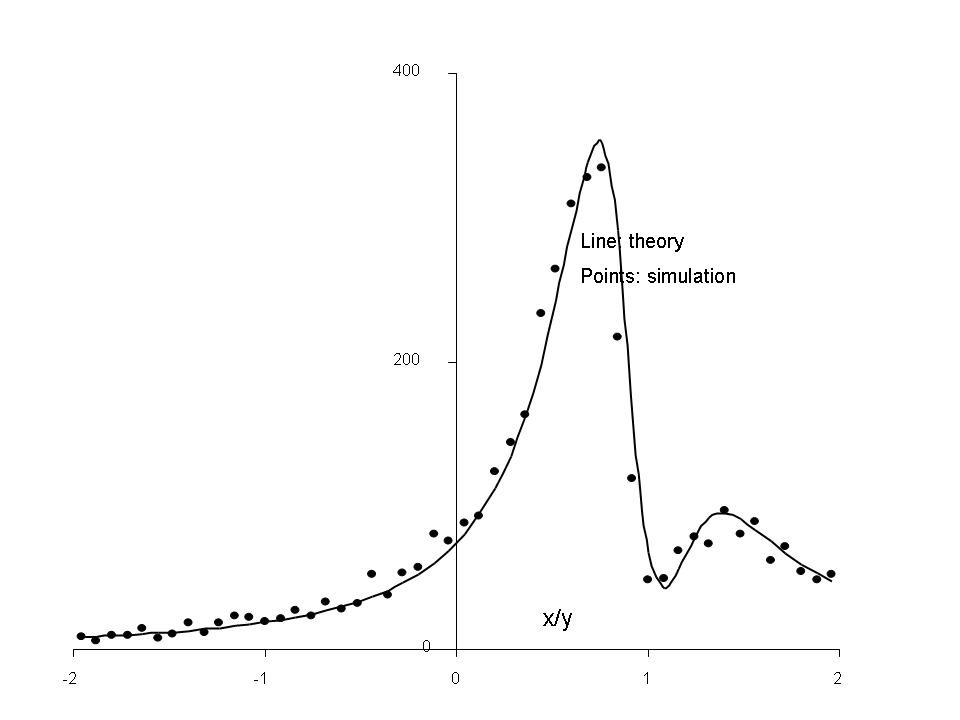
PDF of the Gaussian ratio z and a simulation (points) for σ_{x} = σ_{y} = 1, μ_{x} = 0, μ_{y} = 0.5, ρ_{x} = 0.975.

The figures above show an example of a positively correlated ratio with $\sigma_x =$ $\sigma_y = 1$, $\mu_x = 0$, $\mu_y = 0.5$, and $\rho = 0.975$, in which the shaded wedges represent the increment of area selected by given ratio $x/y \in [r, r + \delta]$ which accumulates probability where they overlap the distribution. The theoretical distribution, derived from the equations under discussion combined with Hinkley's equations, is highly consistent with a simulation result using 5,000 samples. In the top figure it is clear that for a ratio $z = x/y \approx 1$ the wedge has almost bypassed the main distribution mass altogether and this explains the local minimum in the theoretical PDF $p_Z(x/y)$. Conversely as $x/y$ moves either toward or away from one the wedge spans more of the central mass, accumulating a higher probability.

=== Complex normal ratio ===
The ratio of correlated zero-mean circularly symmetric complex normal distributed variables was determined by Baxley et al. and has since been extended to the nonzero-mean and nonsymmetric case. In the correlated zero-mean case, the joint distribution of $x, y$ is
$$f_{x,y}(x,y) = \frac{1}{\pi^2 |\Sigma|} \exp \left ( - \begin{bmatrix} x  \\ y  \end{bmatrix}^H \Sigma ^{-1} \begin{bmatrix}x \\ y  \end{bmatrix} \right )$$
where
$$\begin{align}
\Sigma &= \begin{bmatrix}
\sigma_x^2 & \rho \sigma_x \sigma_y  \\
\rho^* \sigma_x \sigma_y &  \sigma_y^2  \end{bmatrix}; \\
x &= x_r+ix_i; \\
y &= y_r+iy_i;
\end{align}$$
$(\cdot)^H$ is an Hermitian transpose; and
$$\rho = \rho_r +i \rho_i
= \operatorname{E} \bigg(\frac{xy^*}{\sigma_x \sigma_y} \bigg )\; \in \left |\mathbb{C} \right| \le 1.$$

The PDF of $Z = X/Y$ is found to be

$$\begin{align}
f_{z}(z_r,z_i) & = \frac{1-|\rho|^2}{\pi \sigma_x^2 \sigma_y^2 }
\left( \frac{|z|^2}{\sigma_x^2} + \frac{1}{\sigma_y^2} -2\frac{\rho_r z_r - \rho_i z_i}{\sigma_x \sigma_y} \right)^{-2} \\[1ex]
& = \frac{1-|\rho|^2}{\pi \sigma_x^2 \sigma_y^2 }
\left( \left| \frac{z}{\sigma_x} - \frac{\rho^* }{\sigma_y} \right|^2 + \frac{1-|\rho|^2}{\sigma_y^2} \right)^{-2}.
\end{align}$$
In the usual event that $\sigma_x = \sigma_y$ we get
$$f_{z}(z_r,z_i) = \frac{1 - \left|\rho\right|^2}{\pi \left(\left|z - \rho^* \right|^2 + 1 - \left|\rho\right|^2 \right)^2}.$$

Further closed-form results for the CDF are also given.

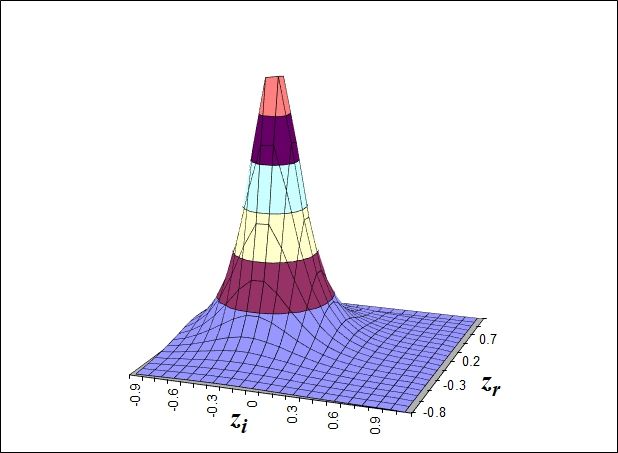
The ratio distribution of correlated complex variables, ρ = 0.7 e^{iπ/4}.

The graph shows the pdf of the ratio of two complex normal variables with a correlation coefficient of $\textstyle \rho = 0.7 e^{i\pi/4}$. The PDF peak occurs at roughly the complex conjugate of a scaled down $\rho$.

== Ratio of log-normal ==
The ratio of independent or correlated log-normals is log-normal. This follows, because if $X_1$ and $X_2$ are log-normally distributed, then $\ln(X_1)$ and $\ln(X_2)$ are normally distributed. If they are independent or their logarithms follow a bivarate normal distribution, then the logarithm of their ratio is the difference of independent or correlated normally distributed random variables, which is normally distributed. (Note: Note, however, that $X_1$ and $X_2$ can be individually log-normally distributed without having a bivariate log-normal distribution.)

This is important for many applications requiring the ratio of random variables that must be positive, where joint distribution of $X_1$ and $X_2$ is adequately approximated by a log-normal. This is a common result of the multiplicative central limit theorem, also known as Gibrat's law, when $X_i$ is the result of an accumulation of many small percentage changes and must be positive and approximately log-normally distributed. (Note: Of course, any invocation of a central limit theorem assumes suitable, commonly met regularity conditions, e.g., finite variance.)

== Uniform ratio distribution ==
With two independent random variables following a uniform distribution, e.g.,
$$p_X(x) = \begin{cases}
1, & 0 < x < 1 \\
0, & \text{otherwise}
\end{cases}$$
the ratio distribution becomes
$$p_Z(z) = \begin{cases}
\tfrac{1}{2},     & 0 < z < 1 \\
\tfrac{1}{2z^2},  & z \geq 1  \\
0,                & \text{otherwise}.
\end{cases}$$

== Cauchy ratio distribution ==
If two independent random variables, $X$ and $Y$ each follow a Cauchy distribution with median equal to zero and shape factor $a$,
$$p_X(x|a) = \frac{a}{\pi (a^2 + x^2)},$$
then the ratio distribution for the random variable $Z = X/Y$ is
$$p_Z(z|a) = \frac{1}{\pi^2(z^2-1)} \ln(z^2).$$
This distribution does not depend on $a$ and the result stated by Springer is not correct.

The ratio distribution is similar to but not the same as the product distribution of the random variable $W = XY$:
$$p_W(w|a) = \frac{a^2}{\pi^2(w^2-a^4)} \ln \left(\frac{w^2}{a^4}\right).$$

More generally, if two independent random variables $X$ and $Y$ each follow a Cauchy distribution with median equal to zero and shape factor $a$ and $b$ respectively, then:

1. The ratio distribution for the random variable $Z = X/Y$ is
  $$p_Z(z|a,b) = \frac{ab}{\pi^2(b^2z^2-a^2)} \ln \left(\frac{b^2 z^2}{a^2}\right).$$
2. The product distribution for the random variable $W = XY$ is
  $$p_W(w|a,b) = \frac{ab}{\pi^2(w^2-a^2b^2)} \ln \left(\frac{w^2}{a^2b^2}\right).$$

The result for the ratio distribution can be obtained from the product distribution by replacing $b$ with $\textstyle \tfrac{1}{b}$.

== Ratio of standard normal to standard uniform ==
If $X$ has a standard normal distribution and $Y$ has a standard uniform distribution, then $Z = X/Y$ has a distribution known as the slash distribution, with probability density function
$$p_Z(z) = \begin{cases}
\frac{\left[ \varphi(0) - \varphi(z) \right]}{z^2}, &  z \ne 0 \\
\frac{\varphi(0)}{2}, & z = 0, \\
\end{cases}$$
where $\varphi(z)$ is the probability density function of the standard normal distribution.

== Chi-squared, Gamma distributions ==
Let $G$ be a normal distribution $\mathcal(0,1)$, $Y$ and $Z$ be chi-squared distributions with $m$ and $n$ degrees of freedom respectively, all independent, with
$$f_\chi(x,k) = \frac{x^{\left(\tfrac{k}{2}-1\right)}e^{-\tfrac{x}{2}} }{2^{k/2}\Gamma\left(\tfrac{k}{2}\right)}.$$
Then

- $\frac{ G }{ \sqrt{ Y / m } } \sim t_m$ is the [[Student's t-distribution|Student's t-distribution]];
- $\frac{ Y / m }{ Z / n } = F_{ m, n },$ i.e. Fisher's F-test distribution;
- $\frac{ Y }{ Y + Z } \sim \beta( \tfrac{m}{2},\tfrac{n}{2} )$ is the beta distribution; and
- $\frac{ Y }{ Z } \sim \beta'( \tfrac{m}{2},\tfrac{n}{2} )$ is the standard beta prime distribution.

If $\textstyle V_1 \sim {\chi'}_{k_1}^2(\lambda)$, a noncentral chi-squared distribution, $\textstyle V_2 \sim {\chi'}_{k_2}^2(0)$, and $V_1$ is independent of $V_2$, then
$$\frac{V_1/k_1}{V_2/k_2} \sim F'_{k_1,k_2}(\lambda),$$
a noncentral FF-distribution.

$\tfrac{m}{n} F'_{m,n} = \beta'( \tfrac{m}{2},\tfrac{n}{2})$ or $F'_{m,n} = \beta'( \tfrac{m}{2},\tfrac{n}{2} ,1,\tfrac{n }{m})$ defines $F'_{m,n}$, Fisher's F density distribution, the PDF of the ratio of two chi-squared distributions with $m, n$ degrees of freedom.

If we enter an F-test table with $m=3$, $n=4$ and 5% probability in the right tail, the critical value is found to be 6.59. This coincides with the integral
$$F_{3,4}(6.59) = \int_{6.59}^\infty \beta'(x; \tfrac{m}{2},\tfrac{n}{2},1,\tfrac{n}{m} ) \,  dx = 0.05 .$$

For gamma distributions $U$ and $V$ with arbitrary shape parameters $\alpha_1$ and $\alpha_2$, and their scale parameters both set to unity (that is, $\textstyle U \sim \Gamma (\alpha_1, 1)$, $\textstyle V \sim \Gamma(\alpha_2, 1)$, where $\textstyle \Gamma(x;\alpha,1) = (x^{\alpha-1}e^{-x})/{\Gamma(\alpha)}$), then

$$\begin{align}
\tfrac{U}{U+V} &\sim \beta(\alpha_1, \alpha_2), & \text{ expectation } &= \tfrac{\alpha_1}{\alpha_1 + \alpha_2 }; \\[1ex]
\tfrac{U}{V} & \sim \beta'(\alpha_1, \alpha_2), & \text{ expectation } &= \tfrac{\alpha_1}{ \alpha_2 -1},\; \alpha_2 > 1; \\[1ex]
\tfrac{V}{U} & \sim \beta'(\alpha_2, \alpha_1), & \text{ expectation } &= \tfrac{\alpha_2}{ \alpha_1 -1},\; \alpha_1 > 1.
\end{align}$$

If $U \sim \Gamma(x;\alpha,1)$, then
$$\theta U \sim \Gamma (x;\alpha,\theta) = \frac { x^{\alpha-1} e^{- x/\theta}}{  \theta^k \Gamma(\alpha)}.$$
Note that here $\theta$ is a scale parameter, rather than a rate parameter.

If $U \sim \Gamma(\alpha_1,\theta_1)$, $V \sim\Gamma(\alpha_2,\theta_2)$, then by rescaling the $\theta$ parameter to unity we have
$$\begin{align}
\frac {\frac {U}{\theta_1}} {\frac {U}{\theta_1} + \frac {V}{\theta_2}}
&= \frac{ \theta_2 U }{ \theta_2 U + \theta_1 V } \sim \beta( \alpha_1, \alpha_2 ) \\
\frac {\frac {U}{\theta_1}} {\frac {V}{\theta_2}}
& = \frac{ \theta_2 }{ \theta_1  } \frac{U }{ V }\sim \beta'( \alpha_1, \alpha_2 ).
\end{align}$$
Thus
$$\begin{align}
\frac{U}{V} &\sim \beta'\left(\alpha_1, \alpha_2, 1, \frac{\theta_1}{\theta_2} \right) \\
\operatorname{E} \left[\frac{U}{V}\right] &= \frac{\theta_1}{\theta_2} \frac{\alpha_1}{\alpha_2 - 1},
\end{align}$$
in which $\beta'(\alpha,\beta,p,q)$ represents the generalised beta prime distribution.

In the foregoing it is apparent that if $X \sim \beta'( \alpha_1, \alpha_2, 1, 1 ) \equiv \beta'( \alpha_1, \alpha_2 )$ then $\theta X \sim \beta'( \alpha_1, \alpha_2, 1, \theta )$. More explicitly, since
$$\beta'(x; \alpha_1, \alpha_2, 1, R ) = \frac{1}{R} \beta' (\frac{x}{R} ; \alpha_1, \alpha_2)$$
if $U \sim \Gamma(\alpha_1, \theta_1 ), V \sim \Gamma(\alpha_2, \theta_2 )$ then
$$\frac {U}{V} \sim \frac{1}{R}  \beta' ( \frac{x}{R}  ; \alpha_1, \alpha_2 )
= \frac { \left(\frac{x}{R} \right)^{\alpha_1-1} } {\left(1+\frac{x}{R} \right)^{\alpha_1+\alpha_2}} \cdot
\frac {1} { \;R\;B( \alpha_1, \alpha_2 )},$$
where
$$\begin{align}
x &\ge 0; \\
R &= \frac {\theta_1}{\theta_2}; \\
B(\alpha_1, \alpha_2) &=  \frac{\Gamma(\alpha_1)\Gamma(\alpha_2)}{\Gamma(\alpha_1 + \alpha_2)}.
\end{align}$$

== Beta distributions ==
First developed by T. Pham-Gia who found that the PDF of a Beta ratio can be expressed in terms of hypergeometric functions. These are calculated numerically as an infinite discrete sum or as an integral. The latter is straightforward such that, if $Y$ is the ratio of two independent Beta samples $Y = X_1/X_2$, each with PDF $B(\alpha, \beta)^{-1} x^{\alpha-1} (1-x)^{\beta-1}$ proceeds in two ranges $0 \le y < 1$ and $1 < y < \infty\,$ thus

$$\begin{align}
&f_A(y|0 < y \le 1) = \frac{1}{B(\alpha_1,\beta_1)(\alpha_2,\beta_2)} y^{\alpha_1 - 1}
\int_0^1 dp \; p^{\alpha1+\alpha_2 -1 }
(1 - p)^{\beta_2 -1} ( 1- py)^{\beta_1-1} \\[6pt]
& f_B(y|1< y<\infty) = \frac{1}{B(\alpha_1,\beta_1)(\alpha_2,\beta_2)} \frac{1}{y^{\alpha_2 + 1}}
\int_0^1 dp \; p^{\alpha1+\alpha_2 -1 }
(1 - p)^{\beta_1-1} \left ( 1- \frac{y}{p} \right)^{\beta_2-1}
\end{align}$$

== Rayleigh Distributions ==
If X, Y are independent samples from the Rayleigh distribution $f_r(r) = (r/\sigma^2) e^ {-r^2/2\sigma^2}, \;\; r \ge 0$, the ratio Z = X/Y follows the distribution

$$f_z(z) = \frac{2  z}{ (1 +  z^2 )^2 }, \;\; z \ge 0$$
and has cdf
$$F_z(z) = 1 - \frac{1}{ 1 + z^2 } = \frac{z^2}{ 1 + z^2 }, \;\;\; z \ge 0$$
The Rayleigh distribution has scaling as its only parameter. The distribution of $Z = \alpha X/Y$ follows
$$f_z(z,\alpha) = \frac{2 \alpha z}{ (\alpha +  z^2 )^2 }, \;\; z > 0$$
and has cdf
$$F_z(z, \alpha) = \frac{ z^2 }{ \alpha + z^2 }, \;\;\; z \ge 0$$

== Fractional gamma distributions (including chi, chi-squared, exponential, Rayleigh and Weibull) ==
The generalized gamma distribution is
$$f(x;a,d,r)=\frac{r}{\Gamma(d/r) a^d } x^{d-1} e^{-(x/a)^r} \; x \ge 0; \;\; a, \; d, \;r > 0$$
which includes the regular gamma, chi, chi-squared, exponential, Rayleigh, Nakagami and Weibull distributions involving fractional powers. Note that here a is a scale parameter, rather than a rate parameter; d is a shape parameter.

If $U \sim f(x;a_1,d_1,r), \; \; V \sim f(x;a_2,d_2,r) \text{ are independent, and } W = U/V$

then $g(w) = \frac{r \left ( \frac {a_1}{a_2} \right )^{d_2} }{B \left ( \frac{d_1}{r}, \frac{d_2}{r} \right ) } \frac{w^{-d_2 -1}}{ \left( 1 + \left( \frac{a_2}{a_1} \right)^{-r} w^{-r} \right) ^ \frac{d_1+d_2}{r} } , \; \; w>0$

where $B(u,v) = \frac{\Gamma(u) \Gamma(v)}{\Gamma(u+v)}$.

=== Modelling a mixture of different scaling factors ===
In the ratios above, Gamma samples, U, V may have differing sample sizes $\alpha_1, \alpha_2$ but must be drawn from the same distribution $\frac { x^{\alpha-1} e^{-x/\theta}}{ \theta^k \Gamma(\alpha)}$ with equal scaling $\theta$.

In situations where U and V are differently scaled, a variables transformation allows the modified random ratio pdf to be determined. Let $X = \frac {U} { U + V} = \frac {1} { 1 + B}$ where $U \sim \Gamma(\alpha_1,\theta), V \sim \Gamma(\alpha_2,\theta), \theta$ arbitrary and, from above, $X \sim \mathrm{Beta}(\alpha_1, \alpha_2), B = V/U \sim \mathrm{Beta}'(\alpha_2, \alpha_1)$.

Rescale V arbitrarily, defining $Y \sim \frac {U} { U + \varphi V} = \frac {1} { 1 + \varphi B}, \;\; 0 \le \varphi \le \infty$

We have $B = \frac{1-X}{X}$ and substitution into Y gives $Y = \frac {X}{\varphi + (1-\varphi)X}$, $dY/dX = \frac {\varphi}{(\varphi + (1-\varphi)X)^2}$

Transforming X to Y gives $f_Y(Y) = \frac{f_X (X) } {| dY/dX|} = \frac {\beta(X,\alpha_1,\alpha_2)}{ \varphi / [\varphi + (1-\varphi) X]^2}$

Noting $X = \frac {\varphi Y}{ 1-(1 - \varphi)Y}$ we finally have
$$f_Y(Y, \varphi) = \frac{\varphi } { [1 - (1 - \varphi)Y]^2} \beta{\left (\frac {\varphi Y}{ 1 - (1-\varphi) Y}, \alpha_1, \alpha_2 \right)}, \;\;\; 0 \le Y \le 1$$

Thus, if $U \sim \Gamma(\alpha_1,\theta_1)$ and $V \sim \Gamma(\alpha_2,\theta_2)$
then $Y = \frac {U} { U + V}$ is distributed as $f_Y(Y, \varphi)$ with $\varphi = \frac {\theta_2}{\theta_1}$

The distribution of Y is limited here to the interval [0,1]. It can be generalized by scaling such that if $Y \sim f_Y(Y,\varphi)$ then

$$\Theta Y \sim   f_Y( Y,\varphi, \Theta)$$

where $f_Y( Y,\varphi, \Theta) = \frac{\varphi / \Theta } { [1 - (1 - \varphi)Y / \Theta]^2} \beta \left (\frac {\varphi Y / \Theta}{ 1 - (1-\varphi) Y / \Theta}, \alpha_1, \alpha_2 \right), \;\;\; 0 \le Y \le \Theta$

$\Theta Y$ is then a sample from $\frac {\Theta U} { U + \varphi V}$

== Reciprocals of samples from beta distributions ==
Though not ratio distributions of two variables, the following identities for one variable are useful:

- If $X \sim \beta (\alpha,\beta)$ then $\mathbf x = \frac{X}{1-X} \sim \beta'(\alpha,\beta)$
- If $\mathbf Y \sim \beta' (\alpha,\beta)$ then $y = \frac{1}{\mathbf Y} \sim \beta'(\beta,\alpha)$ combining the latter two equations yields
- If $X \sim \beta (\alpha,\beta)$ then $\mathbf x = \frac{1}{X} -1 \sim \beta'(\beta,\alpha)$.
- If $\mathbf Y \sim \beta' (\alpha,\beta)$ then $y = \frac{\mathbf Y}{1 + \mathbf Y} \sim \beta(\alpha,\beta)$

Corollary

$$\frac{1}{1 + \mathbf Y}
=  \frac{ \mathbf Y ^ {-1}}{\mathbf Y^{-1} + 1} \sim \beta(\beta,\alpha)$$

$1 + \mathbf Y \sim \{ \; \beta(\beta,\alpha) \; \} ^{-1}$, the distribution of the reciprocals of $\beta(\beta,\alpha)$ samples.

If $U \sim \Gamma ( \alpha , 1), V \sim \Gamma(\beta, 1)$ then $\frac{U}{V} \sim \beta' ( \alpha, \beta )$ and
$$\frac{U / V}{1+U / V} = \frac{U}{V + U } \sim \beta(\alpha,\beta)$$

Further results can be found in the Inverse distribution article.

- If X, Y are independent exponential random variables with mean μ, then X − Y is a double exponential random variable with mean 0 and scale μ.

== Binomial distribution ==
This result was derived by Katz et al.

Suppose $X \sim \operatorname{Binomial}(n,p_1)$ and $Y \sim \text{Binomial}(m,p_2)$ and $X$, $Y$ are independent. Let $T = \frac{X/n}{Y/m}$.

Then $\log(T)$ is approximately normally distributed with mean $\log(p_1/p_2)$ and variance $\frac{(1/p_1)-1}{n} + \frac{(1/p_2)-1}{m}$.

The binomial ratio distribution is of significance in clinical trials: if the distribution of T is known as above, the probability of a given ratio arising purely by chance can be estimated, i.e. a false positive trial. A number of papers compare the robustness of different approximations for the binomial ratio.

== Poisson and truncated Poisson distributions ==
In the ratio of Poisson variables R = X/Y there is a problem that Y is zero with finite probability so R is undefined. To counter this, consider the truncated, or censored, ratio R′ = X/Y where zero sample of Y are discounted. Moreover, in many medical-type surveys, there are systematic problems with the reliability of the zero samples of both X and Y and it may be good practice to ignore the zero samples anyway.

The probability of a null Poisson sample being $e^{-\lambda}$, the generic PDF of a left truncated Poisson distribution is
$$\tilde p_x(x;\lambda)= \frac {1}{1-e^{-\lambda} }
{ \frac{e^{-\lambda} \lambda^{x}}{x!} }, \;\;\; x \in 1,2,3, \cdots$$
which sums to unity. Following Cohen, for n independent trials, the multidimensional truncated PDF is
$$\tilde p(x_1, x_2, \dots ,x_n;\lambda)= \frac{1}{\left(1-e^{-\lambda}\right)^n }
\prod_{i=1}^n{ \frac{e^{-\lambda} \lambda^{x_i}}{x_i!} }, \;\;\; x_i \in 1,2,3, \cdots$$
and the log-likelihood becomes
$$L = \ln (\tilde p) = - n \ln \left(1 - e^{-\lambda}\right)
- n \lambda + \ln(\lambda) \sum_{i=1}^n x_i  - \ln \prod_{i=1}^n (x_i!), \;\;\; x_i \in 1,2,3, \cdots$$
On differentiation we get
$$\frac{dL}{d\lambda}  = \frac{-n}{ 1-e^{-\lambda}} + \frac{1}{\lambda}\sum_{i=1}^n x_i$$
and setting to zero gives the maximum likelihood estimate $\hat \lambda_\text{ML}$
$$\frac{\hat \lambda_\text{ML}}{ 1-e^{-\hat \lambda_\text{ML} }} = \frac{1}{n} \sum_{i=1}^n x_i = \bar x$$

Note that as $\hat \lambda \to 0$ then $\bar x \to 1$ so the truncated maximum likelihood $\lambda$ estimate, though correct for both truncated and untruncated distributions, gives a truncated mean $\bar x$ value which is highly biassed relative to the untruncated one. Nevertheless it appears that $\bar x$ is a sufficient statistic for $\lambda$ since $\hat \lambda_{ML}$ depends on the data only through the sample mean $\bar x = \frac{1}{n} \sum_{i=1}^n x_i$ in the previous equation which is consistent with the methodology of the conventional Poisson distribution.

Absent any closed form solutions, the following approximate reversion for truncated $\lambda$ is valid over the whole range $0 \le \lambda \le \infty; \; 1 \le \bar x \le \infty$.
$$\hat \lambda = \bar x - e^{-( \bar x -1) } - 0.07(\bar x -1)e^{-0.666(\bar x-1)}  + \varepsilon, \;\;\;|\varepsilon | < 0.006$$
which compares with the non-truncated version which is simply $\hat \lambda = \bar x$. Taking the ratio $R = \hat \lambda_X / \hat \lambda_Y$ is a valid operation even though $\hat \lambda_X$ may use a non-truncated model while $\hat \lambda_Y$ has a left-truncated one.

The asymptotic large-$n\lambda$ variance of $\hat\lambda$ (and Cramér–Rao bound) is
$$\mathbb{Var} ( \hat \lambda ) \ge - \left( \mathbb{E}\left[ \frac{\delta ^2 L }{ \delta \lambda^2 } \right]_{\lambda=\hat \lambda} \right) ^{-1}$$

in which substituting L gives
$$\frac{\delta ^2 L }{ \delta \lambda^2 } =
-n \left[ \frac{ \bar x}{\lambda ^2 } -  \frac{e^{-\lambda}}{(1-e^{-\lambda})^2  } \right]$$
Then substituting $\bar x$ from the equation above, we get Cohen's variance estimate
$$\mathbb{Var} ( \hat \lambda )  \ge \frac{ \hat\lambda}{n}  \frac { (1-e^{-\hat\lambda})^2 }{ 1 - (\hat\lambda + 1) e^{-\hat\lambda} }$$

The variance of the point estimate of the mean $\lambda$, on the basis of n trials, decreases asymptotically to zero as n increases to infinity. For small $\lambda$ it diverges from the truncated pdf variance in Springael for example, who quotes a variance of
$$\mathbb {Var} ( \lambda) = \frac {\lambda / n}{1-e^{-\lambda}} \left [ 1 - \frac{\lambda e^{-\lambda} }{1-e^{-\lambda}}\right]$$
for n samples in the left-truncated pdf shown at the top of this section. Cohen showed that the variance of the estimate relative to the variance of the pdf, $\mathbb {Var} ( \hat \lambda) / \mathbb {Var} ( \lambda)$, ranges from 1 for large $\lambda$ (100% efficient) up to 2 as $\lambda$ approaches zero (50% efficient).

These mean and variance parameter estimates, together with parallel estimates for X, can be applied to Normal or Binomial approximations for the Poisson ratio. Samples from trials may not be a good fit for the Poisson process; a further discussion of Poisson truncation is by Dietz and Bohning and there is a Zero-truncated Poisson distribution Wikipedia entry.

== Double Lomax distribution ==
This distribution is the ratio of two Laplace distributions. Let X and Y be standard Laplace identically distributed random variables and let z = X / Y. Then the probability distribution of z is

$$f( x ) = \frac{ 1 }{ 2 \left( 1 + |z| \right)^2 }$$

Let the mean of the X and Y be a. Then the standard double Lomax distribution is symmetric around a.

This distribution has an infinite mean and variance.

If Z has a standard double Lomax distribution, then 1/Z also has a standard double Lomax distribution.

The standard Lomax distribution is unimodal and has heavier tails than the Laplace distribution.

For 0 < a < 1, the a-th moment exists.

$$\Lambda = \frac{|\mathbf{X}|}{|\mathbf{X}+\mathbf{Y}|}$$
$$E( Z^a ) = \frac{ \Gamma( 1 + a ) }{ \Gamma( 1 - a ) }$$

where Γ is the gamma function.

== Ratio distributions in multivariate analysis ==
Ratio distributions also appear in multivariate analysis. If the random matrices X and Y follow a Wishart distribution then the ratio of the determinants
$$\varphi = \frac{|\mathbf{X}|}{|\mathbf{Y}|}$$
is proportional to the product of independent F random variables. In the case where X and Y are from independent standardized Wishart distributions then the ratio
$$\Lambda = \frac{|\mathbf{X}|}{|\mathbf{X}+\mathbf{Y}|}$$
has a Wilks' lambda distribution.

=== Ratios of quadratic forms involving Wishart matrices ===
In relation to Wishart matrix distributions, if $S \sim W_p(\Sigma, \nu + 1)$ is a sample Wishart matrix, and vector $V$ is arbitrary, but statistically independent, then corollary 3.2.9 of Muirhead states
$$\frac{V^T S V}{V^T \Sigma V} \sim \chi^2_\nu.$$

The discrepancy of one in the sample numbers arises from estimation of the sample mean when forming the sample covariance, a consequence of Cochran's theorem. Similarly,
$$\frac{V^T \Sigma^{-1} V}{V^T S^{-1} V} \sim \chi^2_{\nu-p+1},$$
which is Theorem 3.2.12 of Muirhead.

== See also ==
- Relationships among probability distributions
- Inverse distribution (also known as reciprocal distribution)
- Product distribution
- Ratio estimator
- Slash distribution

== Works cited ==
- Baxley, R. T.; Waldenhorst, B. T.; Acosta-Marum, G. (2010). "Complex Gaussian Ratio Distribution with Applications for Error Rate Calculation in Fading Channels with Imperfect CSI". 2010 IEEE Global Telecommunications Conference GLOBECOM 2010. pp. 1–5. doi:10.1109/GLOCOM.2010.5683407. ISBN 978-1-4244-5636-9. S2CID 14100052.
- Bindu, P.; Sangita, K. (2015). "Double Lomax distribution and its applications". Statistica. 75 (3): 331–342. doi:10.6092/issn.1973-2201/5190.
- Brennan, L. E.; Reed, I. S. (January 1982). "An Adaptive Array Signal Processing Algorithm for Communications". IEEE Transactions on Aerospace and Electronic Systems. AES-18 (1): 124–130. Bibcode:1982ITAES..18..124B. doi:10.1109/TAES.1982.309212. S2CID 45721922.
- Brody, James P.; Williams, Brian A.; Wold, Barbara J.; Quake, Stephen R. (October 2002). "Significance and statistical errors in the analysis of DNA microarray data" (PDF). Proceedings of the National Academy of Sciences of the United States of America. 99 (20): 12975–12978. Bibcode:2002PNAS...9912975B. doi:10.1073/pnas.162468199. PMC 130571. PMID 12235357.
- Cohen, A. Clifford (June 1960). "Estimating the Parameter in a Conditional Poisson Distribution". Biometrics. 60 (2): 203–211. doi:10.2307/2527552. JSTOR 2527552.
- Curtiss, J. H. (December 1941). "On the Distribution of the Quotient of Two Chance Variables". The Annals of Mathematical Statistics. 12 (4): 409–421. doi:10.1214/aoms/1177731679. JSTOR 2235953.
- Díaz-Francés, Eloísa; Rubio, Francisco J. (2012-01-24). "On the existence of a normal approximation to the distribution of the ratio of two independent normal random variables". Statistical Papers. 54 (2). Springer Science and Business Media: 309–323. doi:10.1007/s00362-012-0429-2. ISSN 0932-5026. S2CID 122038290.
- Dietz, Ekkehart; Bohning, Dankmar (2000). "On Estimation of the Poisson Parameter in Zero-Modified Poisson Models". Computational Statistics & Data Analysis. 34 (4): 441–459. doi:10.1016/S0167-9473(99)00111-5.
- Fieller, E. C. (November 1932). "The Distribution of the Index in a Normal Bivariate Population". Biometrika. 24 (3/4): 428–440. doi:10.2307/2331976. JSTOR 2331976.
- Geary, R. C. (1930). "The Frequency Distribution of the Quotient of Two Normal Variates". Journal of the Royal Statistical Society. 93 (3): 442–446. doi:10.2307/2342070. JSTOR 2342070.
- Hamedani, G. G. (Oct 2013). "Characterizations of Distribution of Ratio of Rayleigh Random Variables". Pakistan Journal of Statistics. 29 (4): 369–376.
- Hayya, Jack; Armstrong, Donald; Gressis, Nicolas (July 1975). "A Note on the Ratio of Two Normally Distributed Variables". Management Science. 21 (11): 1338–1341. doi:10.1287/mnsc.21.11.1338. JSTOR 2629897.
- Hinkley, D. V. (December 1969). "On the Ratio of Two Correlated Normal Random Variables". Biometrika. 56 (3): 635–639. doi:10.2307/2334671. JSTOR 2334671.
- Katz, D.; Baptista, J.; Azen, S. P.; Pike, M. C. (1978). "Obtaining Confidence Intervals for the Risk Ratio in Cohort Studies". Biometrics. 34 (3): 469–474. doi:10.2307/2530610. JSTOR 2530610.
- Kermond, John (2010). "An Introduction to the Algebra of Random Variables". Mathematical Association of Victoria 47th Annual Conference Proceedings – New Curriculum. New Opportunities. The Mathematical Association of Victoria: 1–16. ISBN 978-1-876949-50-1.
- Marsaglia, George (April 1964). Ratios of Normal Variables and Ratios of Sums of Uniform Variables (PDF) (Report). Defense Technical Information Center. Archived from the original on 2016-03-03.
- Marsaglia, George (March 1965). "Ratios of Normal Variables and Ratios of Sums of Uniform Variables". Journal of the American Statistical Association. 60 (309): 193–204. doi:10.2307/2283145. JSTOR 2283145. Archived from the original on September 23, 2017.
- Muirhead, Robb (1982). Aspects of Multivariate Statistical Theory. Wiley.
- Pham-Gia, T. (2000). "Distribution of the Ratios of Independent Beta Variables and Applications". Communications in Statistics - Theory and Methods. 29 (12): 2693–2715. doi:10.1080/03610920008832632.
- Pham-Gia, T.; Turkkan, N.; Marchand, E. (2006). "Density of the Ratio of Two Normal Random Variables and Applications". Communications in Statistics – Theory and Methods. 35 (9). Taylor & Francis: 1569–1591. doi:10.1080/03610920600683689.
- Rao, B. Raja; Garg, M. L. (1969). "A note on the generalized (positive) Cauchy distribution". Canadian Mathematical Bulletin. 12 (6): 865–868. doi:10.4153/CMB-1969-114-2.
- Šimon, Ján; Ftorek, Branislav (2022-09-15). "Basic Statistical Properties of the Knot Efficiency". Symmetry. 14 (9). MDPI: 1926. Bibcode:2022Symm...14.1926S. doi:10.3390/sym14091926. ISSN 2073-8994.
- Sourisseau, M.; Wu, H.-T.; Zhou, Z. (October 2022). "Asymptotic analysis of synchrosqueezing transform—toward statistical inference with nonlinear-type time-frequency analysis". Annals of Statistics. 50 (5): 2694–2712. arXiv:1904.09534. doi:10.1214/22-AOS2203.
- Springael, Johan (2006). "On the sum of independent zero-truncated Poisson random variables" (PDF). University of Antwerp, Faculty of Business and Economics.
- Springer, Melvin Dale (1979). The Algebra of Random Variables. Wiley. doi:10.1080/03610920600683689. ISBN 0-471-01406-0. S2CID 120891296.
