= Taylor expansions for the moments of functions of random variables =

Concept in probability theory

In probability theory, it is possible to approximate the moments, such as the mean $\mu = \operatorname{E}\left[X\right]$ and variance $\sigma^2 = \operatorname{var}\left[X\right]$, of a function f of a random variable X using Taylor expansions, provided that f is sufficiently differentiable and that the moments of X are finite.

== First moment ==
A Taylor expansion of the expected value of $f(X)$ can be found via:

$$\begin{align}
\operatorname{E}\left[f(X)\right] & {} = \operatorname{E}\left[f\left(\mu_X + \left(X - \mu_X\right)\right)\right] \\
& {} \approx \operatorname{E}\left[f(\mu_X) + f'(\mu_X)\left(X-\mu_X\right) + \frac{1}{2}f''(\mu_X) \left(X - \mu_X\right)^2 \right] \\
& {} = f(\mu_X) + f'(\mu_X) \operatorname{E} \left[ X-\mu_X \right] + \frac{1}{2}f''(\mu_X) \operatorname{E} \left[ \left(X - \mu_X\right)^2 \right].
\end{align}$$

Since $E[X-\mu_X]=0,$ the second term vanishes. Also, $E[(X-\mu_X)^2]$ is $\sigma_X^2$. Therefore,

$$\operatorname{E}\left[f(X)\right]\approx f(\mu_X) +\frac{f''(\mu_X)}{2}\sigma_X^2$$.

So, the output expected value is seen to depend on the input variance.

== Second moment ==
Similarly, the variance is obtained as:

$$\operatorname{var}\left[f(X)\right]\approx \left(f'(\operatorname{E}\left[X\right])\right)^2\operatorname{var}\left[X\right] + \frac{\left(f''(\operatorname{E}\left[X\right])\right)^2}{2}\left(\operatorname{var}\left[X\right]\right)^2 = \left(f'(\mu_X)\right)^2\sigma^2_X -\frac{1}{4}\left(f''(\mu_X)\right)^2\sigma_X^4$$

It improves on the typical first-order approximation, which will be a poor approximation if $f(X)$ is highly non-linear (see uncertainty propagation):

$$\operatorname{var}\left[f(X)\right]\approx \left(f'(\operatorname{E}\left[X\right])\right)^2\operatorname{var}\left[X\right]$$

A third order approximation, when X follows a normal distribution, is:

$$\operatorname{var}\left[f(X)\right]\approx = \left(f'(\mu_X)\right)^2\sigma^2_X + \frac{1}{2}\left(f''(\mu_X)\right)^2\sigma_X^4 + \left(f'(\mu_X)\right)\left(f'''(\mu_X)\right)\sigma_X^4$$

== Random vectors ==
If X is a random vector, the approximations for the mean and variance of $f(X)$ are given by

$$\begin{align}
\operatorname{E}(f(X)) &= f(\mu_X) + \frac{1}{2} \operatorname{trace}(H_f(\mu_X) \Sigma_X) \\
\operatorname{var}(f(X)) &= \nabla f(\mu_X)^t \Sigma_X \nabla f(\mu_X) + \frac{1}{2} \operatorname{trace} \left( H_f(\mu_X) \Sigma_X H_f(\mu_X) \Sigma_X \right).
\end{align}$$

Here $\nabla f$ and $H_f$ denote the gradient and the Hessian matrix respectively, and $\Sigma_X$ is the covariance matrix of X.

== Multiple variables ==
It is possible to generalize this to functions of more than one variable using multivariate Taylor expansions. For example (see ratio distribution),

$$\operatorname{E}\left[\frac{X}{Y}\right]\approx\frac{\operatorname{E}\left[X\right]}{\operatorname{E}\left[Y\right]} -\frac{\operatorname{cov}\left[X,Y\right]}{\operatorname{E}\left[Y\right]^2}+\frac{\operatorname{E}\left[X\right]}{\operatorname{E}\left[Y\right]^3}\operatorname{var}\left[Y\right]$$

With $f(X) = g(X)^2$, we get $\operatorname{E}\left[Y^2\right]$. The variance is then computed using the formula $\operatorname{var}\left[Y\right] = \operatorname{E}\left[Y^2\right] - \mu_Y^2$.

An example is,

$$\operatorname{var}\left[\frac{X}{Y}\right]\approx\frac{\operatorname{var}\left[X\right]}{\operatorname{E}\left[Y\right]^2}-\frac{2\operatorname{E}\left[X\right]}{\operatorname{E}\left[Y\right]^3}\operatorname{cov}\left[X,Y\right]+\frac{\operatorname{E}\left[X\right]^2}{\operatorname{E}\left[Y\right]^4}\operatorname{var}\left[Y\right].$$

=== First product moment ===
To find a second-order approximation for the covariance of functions of two random variables (with the same function applied to both), one can proceed as follows. First, note that $\operatorname{cov}\left[f(X),f(Y)\right]=\operatorname{E}\left[f(X)f(Y)\right]-\operatorname{E}\left[f(X)\right]\operatorname{E}\left[f(Y)\right]$. Since a second-order expansion for $\operatorname{E}\left[f(X)\right]$ has already been derived above, it only remains to find $\operatorname{E}\left[f(X)f(Y)\right]$. Treating $f(X)f(Y)$ as a two-variable function, the second-order Taylor expansion is as follows:

$$\begin{align}
f(X)f(Y) & {} \approx f(\mu_X) f(\mu_Y) + (X-\mu_X) f'(\mu_X)f(\mu_Y) + (Y - \mu_Y)f(\mu_X)f'(\mu_Y) + \frac{1}{2}\left[(X-\mu_X)^2 f''(\mu_X)f(\mu_Y) + 2(X-\mu_X)(Y-\mu_Y)f'(\mu_X)f'(\mu_Y) + (Y-\mu_Y)^2 f(\mu_X)f''(\mu_Y) \right]
\end{align}$$

Taking expectation of the above and simplifying—making use of the identities $\operatorname{E}(X^2)=\operatorname{var}(X)+\left[\operatorname{E}(X)\right]^2$ and $\operatorname{E}(XY)=\operatorname{cov}(X,Y)+\left[\operatorname{E}(X)\right]\left[\operatorname{E}(Y)\right]$—leads to $\operatorname{E}\left[f(X)f(Y)\right]\approx f(\mu_X)f(\mu_Y)+f'(\mu_X)f'(\mu_Y)\operatorname{cov}(X,Y)+\frac{1}{2}f''(\mu_X)f(\mu_Y)\operatorname{var}(X)+\frac{1}{2}f(\mu_X)f''(\mu_Y)\operatorname{var}(Y)$. Hence,

$$\begin{align}
\operatorname{cov}\left[f(X),f(Y)\right] & {} \approx f(\mu_X)f(\mu_Y)+f'(\mu_X)f'(\mu_Y)\operatorname{cov}(X,Y)+\frac{1}{2}f''(\mu_X)f(\mu_Y)\operatorname{var}(X)+\frac{1}{2}f(\mu_X)f''(\mu_Y)\operatorname{var}(Y) - \left[f(\mu_X)+\frac{1}{2}f''(\mu_X)\operatorname{var}(X)\right] \left[f(\mu_Y)+\frac{1}{2}f''(\mu_Y)\operatorname{var}(Y) \right] \\
& {} = f'(\mu_X)f'(\mu_Y) \operatorname{cov}(X,Y) - \frac{1}{4}f''(\mu_X)f''(\mu_Y)\operatorname{var}(X)\operatorname{var}(Y)
\end{align}$$

== See also ==
- Propagation of uncertainty
- WKB approximation
- Delta method
- Monte Carlo simulation
