= Ratio estimator =

Statistical estimator for ratio of means

The ratio estimator is a statistical estimator for the ratio of means of two random variables. Ratio estimates are biased and corrections must be made when they are used in experimental or survey work. The ratio estimates are asymmetrical so symmetrical tests such as the t test should not be used to generate confidence intervals.

The bias is of the order O(1/n) (see big O notation) so as the sample size (n) increases, the bias will asymptotically approach 0. Therefore, the estimator is approximately unbiased for large sample sizes.

== Definition ==
Assume there are two characteristics – x and y – that can be observed for each sampled element in the data set. The ratio R is

$$R = \bar{\mu}_y  / \bar{\mu}_x$$

The ratio estimate of a value of the y variate (θ_{y}) is

$$\theta_y = R \theta_x$$

where θ_{x} is the corresponding value of the x variate. θ_{y} is known to be asymptotically normally distributed.

== Statistical properties ==
The sample ratio (r) is estimated from the sample

$$r = \frac{ \bar{ y } }{ \bar{ x } } = \frac{ \sum_{ i = 1 }^n y_i }{ \sum_{ i = 1 }^n x_i }$$

That the ratio is biased can be shown with Jensen's inequality as follows (assuming independence between $\bar{x}$ and $\bar{y}$):

$$E\left( \frac{ \bar{y} }{ \bar{x} } \right) = E\left( \bar{y} \frac{ 1 }{ \bar{x} } \right) = E( \bar{y} )E\left( \frac{ 1 }{ \bar{x} } \right) \ge E( \bar{y} )\frac{ 1 }{ E( \bar{x} ) } = \frac{ E( \bar{y} )}{ E( \bar{x} ) } = \frac{ E( y ) }{ E ( x ) } = \frac{ m_y }{ m_x }$$

where $m_x$ is the mean of the variate $x$ and $m_y$ is the mean of the variate $y$.

Under simple random sampling the bias is of the order O( n^{−1} ). An upper bound on the relative bias of the estimate is provided by the coefficient of variation (the ratio of the standard deviation to the mean). Under simple random sampling the relative bias is O( n^{−1/2} ).

=== Correction of the mean's bias ===
The correction methods, depending on the distributions of the x and y variates, differ in their efficiency making it difficult to recommend an overall best method. Because the estimates of r are biased a corrected version should be used in all subsequent calculations.

A correction of the bias accurate to the first order is

$$r_\mathrm{ corr } = r - \frac{ s_{ x y } }{ m_x }$$

where m_{x} is the mean of the variate x and s_{xy} is the covariance between x and y.

To simplify the notation s_{xy} will be used subsequently to denote the covariance between the variates x and y.

Another estimator based on the Taylor expansion is

$$r_\mathrm{ corr } = r - ( 1 - \frac{ n - 1 }{ N - 1 } ) \frac{ r s_x^2 - s_{ x y } }{ n m_x^2 }$$

where n is the sample size, N is the population size, m_{x} is the mean of the x variate and s_{x}^{2} and s_{y}^{2} are the sample variances of the x and y variates respectively.

A computationally simpler but slightly less accurate version of this estimator is

$$r_\mathrm{ corr } = r - \frac{ N - n }{ N } \frac{ r s_x^2 - s_{ x y } }{ n m_x^2 }$$

where N is the population size, n is the sample size, m_{x} is the mean of the x variate and s_{x}^{2} and s_{y}^{2} are the sample variances of the x and y variates respectively. These versions differ only in the factor in the denominator (N - 1). For a large N the difference is negligible.

If x and y are unitless counts with Poisson distribution a second-order correction is

$$r_\mathrm{ corr } = r \left[ 1 + \frac{ 1 }{ n } \left( \frac{ 1 }{ m_x } - \frac{ s_{ xy } }{ m_x m_y } \right) + \frac{ 1 }{ n^2 } \left( \frac{ 2 }{ m_x^2 } - \frac{ s_{ xy } }{ m_x m_y } \left[ 2 + \frac{ 3 }{ m_x } \right] + \frac{ s_{ x^2 y } }{ m_x^2 m_y } \right) \right]$$

Other methods of bias correction have also been proposed. To simplify the notation the following variables will be used

$$\theta = \frac{ 1 }{ n } - \frac{ 1 }{ N }$$
$$c_x^2 = \frac{ s_x^2 }{ m_x^2 }$$
$$c_{ xy } = \frac{ s_{xy} }{ m_x m_y }$$

Pascual's estimator:

$$r_\mathrm{ corr } = r + \frac{ N - 1 }{ N } \frac{ m_y - r m_x }{ n - 1 }$$

Beale's estimator:

$$r_\mathrm{ corr } = r \frac{ 1 + \theta c_{ xy } }{ 1 + \theta c_x^2 }$$

Tin's estimator:

$$r_\mathrm{ corr } = r \left( 1 + \theta \left(  c_{ xy } - c_x^2 \right) \right)$$

Sahoo's estimator:

$$r_\mathrm{ corr } = \frac{ r }{ 1 + \theta ( c_x^2 - c_{ xy } ) }$$

Sahoo has also proposed a number of additional estimators:

$$r_\mathrm{ corr } = r ( 1 + \theta c_{ xy } ) ( 1 - \theta c_x^2 )$$

$$r_\mathrm{ corr } = \frac{ r ( 1 - \theta c_x^2 ) }{ 1 - \theta c_{ xy } }$$

$$r_\mathrm{ corr } = \frac{ r }{ ( 1 - \theta c_{ xy } )( 1 + \theta c_x^2 ) }$$

If x and y are unitless counts with Poisson distribution and m_{x} and m_{y} are both greater than 10, then the following approximation is correct to order O( n^{−3} ).

$$r_\mathrm{corr} = r \left[ 1 - \frac{ 2 }{ n^2 m_x } \left( \frac{ 1 }{ m_x } - \frac{ s_{ xy } }{ m_x m_y } \right) \left( 1 + \frac{ 13 }{ 2n } + \frac{ 8 }{ n m_x } \right) \right]$$

An asymptotically correct estimator is

$$r_\mathrm{ corr } = r + c_x^2 \frac{ m_y }{ m_x } - \frac{ s_{ xy } }{ m_x^2 }$$

== Jackknife estimation ==
A jackknife estimate of the ratio is less biased than the naive form. A jackknife estimator of the ratio is

$$r_\mathrm{corr} = nr - \frac{ n - 1 }{ n } \sum_{ i \ne j =  1 }^n r_i$$

where n is the size of the sample and the r_{i} are estimated with the omission of one pair of variates at a time.

An alternative method is to divide the sample into g groups each of size p with n = pg. Let r_{i} be the estimate of the i^{th} group. Then the estimator

$$r_\mathrm{corr} = gr - \frac{ g - 1 }{ g } \sum_{ i = 1 }^g r_i = g \left(r - \bar{ r } \right) + \bar{ r }$$

where $\bar{ r }$ is the mean of the ratios r_{g} of the g groups, has a bias of at most O( n^{−2} ).

Other estimators based on the division of the sample into g groups are:

$$r_\mathrm{ corr } = \frac{ g }{ g + 1 } r - \frac{ 1 }{ g ( g - 1 ) } \sum_{ i = 1 }^g r_i$$

$$r_\mathrm{ corr } = \bar{ r } +\frac{ n }{ n - 1 } \frac{ m_y - \bar{ r } m_x }{ m_x }$$

$$r_\mathrm{ corr } = \bar{ r_g } + \frac{ g ( m_y - \bar{ r_g } m_x ) }{ m_x }$$

where $\bar{ r }$ is the mean of the ratios r_{g} of the g groups and

$$\bar{ r_g } = \sum \frac{ r_i' }{ g }$$

where r_{i}^{'} is the value of the sample ratio with the i^{th} group omitted.

=== Other methods of estimation ===
Other methods of estimating a ratio estimator include maximum likelihood and bootstrapping.

== Estimate of total ==
The estimated total of the y variate ( τ_{y} ) is

$$\tau_y = r \tau_x$$

where ( τ_{x} ) is the total of the x variate.

== Variance estimates ==
The variance of the sample ratio is approximately:

$$\operatorname{ var }( r ) = \frac{ 1 }{ s_x^2 + m_x^2 } \left[ ( s_y^2 - s_{ x^2 [ y^2 / x^2 ] } ) - ( s_{ x [ y / x ] } )^2 +2 m_y s_{ x[ y / x ] } - \frac{ s_x^2 }{ m_x^2 }( m_y - s_{ x[ y / x ] }^2) \right]$$

where s_{x}^{2} and s_{y}^{2} are the variances of the x and y variates respectively, m_{x} and m_{y} are the means of the x and y variates respectively and s_{xy} is the covariance of x and y.

Although the approximate variance estimator of the ratio given below is biased, if the sample size is large, the bias in this estimator is negligible.

$$\operatorname{ var }( r ) = \frac{1}{n} \frac{ N - n }{ N } \frac{ 1 }{ m_x^2 } \frac{ \sum_{ i = 1 }^n( y_i - rx_i ) ^2}{ n - 1 }$$

where N is the population size, n is the sample size and m_{x} is the mean of the x variate.

Another estimator of the variance based on the Taylor expansion is

$$\operatorname{ var }( r ) = \frac{ 1 }{ n } ( 1 - \frac{ n - 1 }{ N - 1 } ) \frac{ r^2 s_x^2 + s_y^2 - 2 r s_{ xy } }{ m_x^2 }$$

where n is the sample size and N is the population size and s_{xy} is the covariance of x and y.

An estimate accurate to O( n^{−2} ) is

$$\operatorname{ var }( r ) = \frac{ 1 }{ n }\left[ \frac{ s_y^2 }{ m_x^2 } + \frac{ m_y^2 s_x^2  }{ m_x^4 } - \frac{ 2m_y s_{ xy } }{ m_x^3 } \right]$$

If the probability distribution is Poissonian, an estimator accurate to O( n^{−3} ) is

$$\operatorname{ var }( r ) = r^2 \left[ \frac{ 1 }{ n } \left( \frac{ 1 }{ m_x } + \frac{ 1 }{ m_y } - \frac{ 2 s_{ xy } }{ m_x m_y } \right) + \frac{ 1 }{ n^2 } \left( \frac{ 6 }{ m_x^2 } + \frac{ 3 }{ m_x m_y } + s_{ xy }\left[ \frac{ 4 }{ m_y^2 } - \frac{ 8 }{ m_x m_y } - \frac{ 16 }{ m_x^2 m_y } + \frac{ 5 s_{ xy } }{ m_x^2 m_y^2 } \right] + \frac{ 4 s_{ x^2 y } }{ m_x^2 m_y } - \frac{ 2 s_{ x y^2 }}{ m_x m_y^2 } \right) \right]$$

A jackknife estimator of the variance is

$$\operatorname{ var }( r ) = \frac{ (n-1) }{ n } \sum_{ i = 1 }^n ( r_i - r_J )^2$$

where r_{i} is the ratio with the i^{th} pair of variates omitted and r_{J} is the jackknife estimate of the ratio.

=== Variance of total ===
The variance of the estimated total is

$$\operatorname{ var }( \tau_y ) = \tau_y^2 \operatorname{ var }( r )$$

=== Variance of mean ===
The variance of the estimated mean of the y variate is

$$\operatorname{ var }( \bar{ y } ) = m_x^2 \operatorname{ var }( r ) = \frac{ N - n }{ N } \frac{ \sum_{ i = 1 }^n( y_i - rx_i )^2 }{ n - 1 }
= \frac{ N - n }{ N } \frac{ ( s_y^2 +r^2 s_x^2 - 2r s_{ xy } ) }{ n }$$

where m_{x} is the mean of the x variate, s_{x}^{2} and s_{y}^{2} are the sample variances of the x and y variates respectively and s_{xy} is the covariance of x and y.

== Skewness ==
The skewness and the kurtosis of the ratio depend on the distributions of the x and y variates. Estimates have been made of these parameters for normally distributed x and y variates but for other distributions no expressions have yet been derived. It has been found that in general ratio variables are skewed to the right, are leptokurtic and their nonnormality is increased when magnitude of the denominator's coefficient of variation is increased.

For normally distributed x and y variates the skewness of the ratio is approximately

$$\gamma = \left( \frac{ m_y \omega }{ \sqrt{ n m_x m_y \omega^2 + m_x^2 m_y } } \right)\left(  6 + \frac{ 1 }{ n m_x } \left[ 44 + \frac{ 1 }{ 1 + \omega^2 m_y / m_x } \right] \right)$$

where

$$\omega = 1 - m_x \operatorname{cov}( x, y )$$

=== Effect on confidence intervals ===
Because the ratio estimate is generally skewed confidence intervals created with the variance and symmetrical tests such as the t test are incorrect. These confidence intervals tend to overestimate the size of the left confidence interval and underestimate the size of the right.

If the ratio estimator is unimodal (which is frequently the case) then a conservative estimate of the 95% confidence intervals can be made with the Vysochanskiï–Petunin inequality.

== Alternative methods of bias reduction ==
An alternative method of reducing or eliminating the bias in the ratio estimator is to alter the method of sampling. The variance of the ratio using these methods differs from the estimates given previously. Note that while many applications such as those discussion in Lohr are intended to be restricted to positive integers only, such as sizes of sample groups, the Midzuno-Sen method works for any sequence of positive numbers, integral or not. It's not clear what it means that Lahiri's method works since it returns a biased result.

=== Lahiri's method ===
The first of these sampling schemes is a double use of a sampling method introduced by Lahiri in 1951. The algorithm here is based upon the description by Lohr.

1. Choose a number M = max( x_{1}, ..., x_{N}) where N is the population size.
2. Choose i at random from a uniform distribution on [1,N].
3. Choose k at random from a uniform distribution on [1,M].
4. If k ≤ x_{i}, then x_{i} is retained in the sample. If not then it is rejected.
5. Repeat this process from step 2 until the desired sample size is obtained.

The same procedure for the same desired sample size is carried out with the y variate.

Lahiri's scheme as described by Lohr is biased high and, so, is interesting only for historical reasons. The Midzuno-Sen technique described below is recommended instead.

=== Midzuno-Sen's method ===
In 1952 Midzuno and Sen independently described a sampling scheme that provides an unbiased estimator of the ratio.

The first sample is chosen with probability proportional to the size of the x variate. The remaining n - 1 samples are chosen at random without replacement from the remaining N - 1 members in the population. The probability of selection under this scheme is

$$P = \frac{ \sum x_i } { { N - 1 \choose n - 1 } X }$$

where X is the sum of the N x variates and the x_{i} are the n members of the sample. Then the ratio of the sum of the y variates and the sum of the x variates chosen in this fashion is an unbiased estimate of the ratio estimator.

In symbols we have

$$r = \frac { \sum y_i }{ \sum x_i }$$

where x_{i} and y_{i} are chosen according to the scheme described above.

The ratio estimator given by this scheme is unbiased.

Särndal, Swensson, and Wretman credit Lahiri, Midzuno and Sen for the insights leading to this method but Lahiri's technique is biased high.

=== Other ratio estimators ===
Tin (1965) described and compared ratio estimators proposed by Beale (1962) and Quenouille (1956) and proposed a modified approach (now referred to as Tin's method). These ratio estimators are commonly used to calculate pollutant loads from sampling of waterways, particularly where flow is measured more frequently than water quality. For example, see Quilbe et al., (2006)

== Ordinary least squares regression ==
If a linear relationship between the x and y variates exists and the regression equation passes through the origin then the estimated variance of the regression equation is always less than that of the ratio estimator. The precise relationship between the variances depends on the linearity of the relationship between the x and y variates: when the relationship is other than linear the ratio estimate may have a lower variance than that estimated by regression.

== Uses ==
Although the ratio estimator may be of use in a number of settings it is of particular use in two cases:

- when the variates x and y are highly correlated through the origin.
- In survey methodology when estimating a weighted average in which the denominator indicates the sum of weights that reflect the total population size, but the total population size is unknown.

== History ==
The first known use of the ratio estimator was by John Graunt in England who in 1662 was the first to estimate the ratio y/x where y represented the total population and x the known total number of registered births in the same areas during the preceding year.

Later Messance (~1765) and Moheau (1778) published very carefully prepared estimates for France based on enumeration of population in certain districts and on the count of births, deaths and marriages as reported for the whole country. The districts from which the ratio of inhabitants to birth was determined only constituted a sample.

In 1802, Laplace wished to estimate the population of France. No population census had been carried out and Laplace lacked the resources to count every individual. Instead he sampled 30 parishes whose total number of inhabitants was 2,037,615. The parish baptismal registrations were considered to be reliable estimates of the number of live births so he used the total number of births over a three-year period. The sample estimate was 71,866.333 baptisms per year over this period giving a ratio of one registered baptism for every 28.35 persons. The total number of baptismal registrations for France was also available to him and he assumed that the ratio of live births to population was constant. He then used the ratio from his sample to estimate the population of France.

Karl Pearson said in 1897 that the ratio estimates are biased and cautioned against their use.

== See also ==
- Mark and recapture, another way of estimating population using a ratio.
- Ratio distribution
