= Slash distribution =

Concept in probability theory

Slash
- Probability density function

- Cumulative distribution function
- Parameters: none
- Support: $x\in(-\infty,\infty)$
- PDF: $$\begin{cases} \frac{\varphi(0) - \varphi(x)}{x^2} &  x \ne 0 \\ \frac{1}{2\sqrt{2\pi}} & x = 0 \\ \end{cases}$$
- CDF: $$\begin{cases} \Phi(x) - \left[ \varphi(0) - \varphi(x) \right] / x &  x \ne 0 \\ 1 / 2 & x = 0 \\ \end{cases}$$
- Mean: Does not exist
- Median: 0
- Mode: 0
- Variance: Does not exist
- Skewness: Does not exist
- Excess kurtosis: Does not exist
- MGF: Does not exist
- CF: $\sqrt{2\pi}\Big(\varphi(t)+t\Phi(t)-\max\{t,0\}\Big)$

In probability theory, the slash distribution is the probability distribution of a standard normal variate divided by an independent standard uniform variate. In other words, if the random variable Z has a normal distribution with zero mean and unit variance, the random variable U has a uniform distribution on [0,1] and Z and U are statistically independent, then the random variable X = Z / U has a slash distribution. The slash distribution is an example of a ratio distribution. The distribution was named by William H. Rogers and John Tukey in a paper published in 1972.

The probability density function (pdf) is

$$f(x) = \frac{\varphi(0) - \varphi(x)}{x^2}.$$

where $\varphi(x)$ is the probability density function of the standard normal distribution. The quotient is undefined at x = 0, but the discontinuity is removable:

$$\lim_{x\to 0} f(x) = \frac{\varphi(0)}{2} = \frac{1}{2\sqrt{2\pi}}$$

The most common use of the slash distribution is in simulation studies. It is a useful distribution in this context because it has heavier tails than a normal distribution, but it is not as pathological as the Cauchy distribution.

== See also ==
- Scale mixture
