= Relationships among probability distributions =

Topic in probability theory and statistics

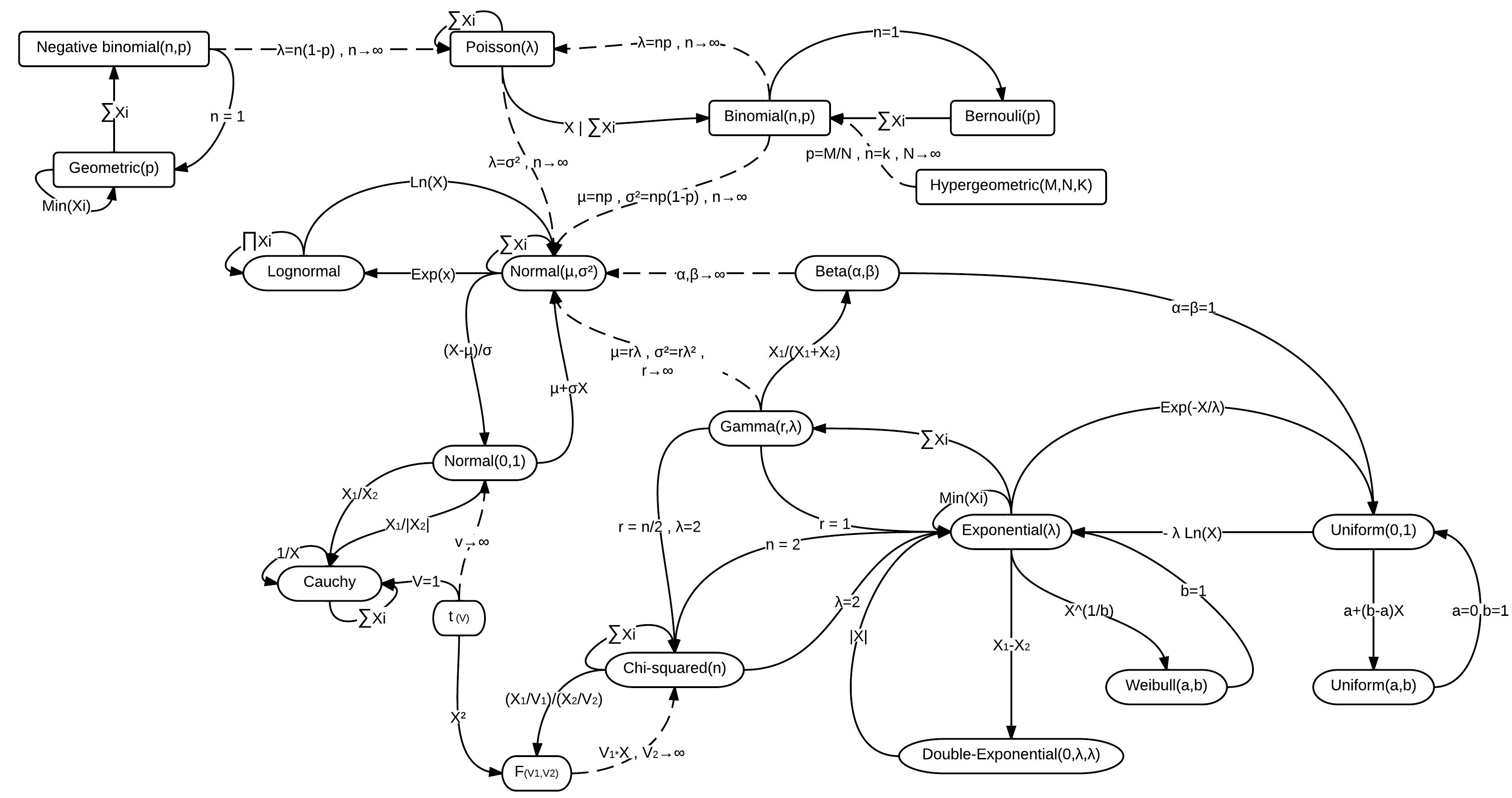
Relationships among some of univariate probability distributions are illustrated with connected lines. dashed lines means approximate relationship. more info:

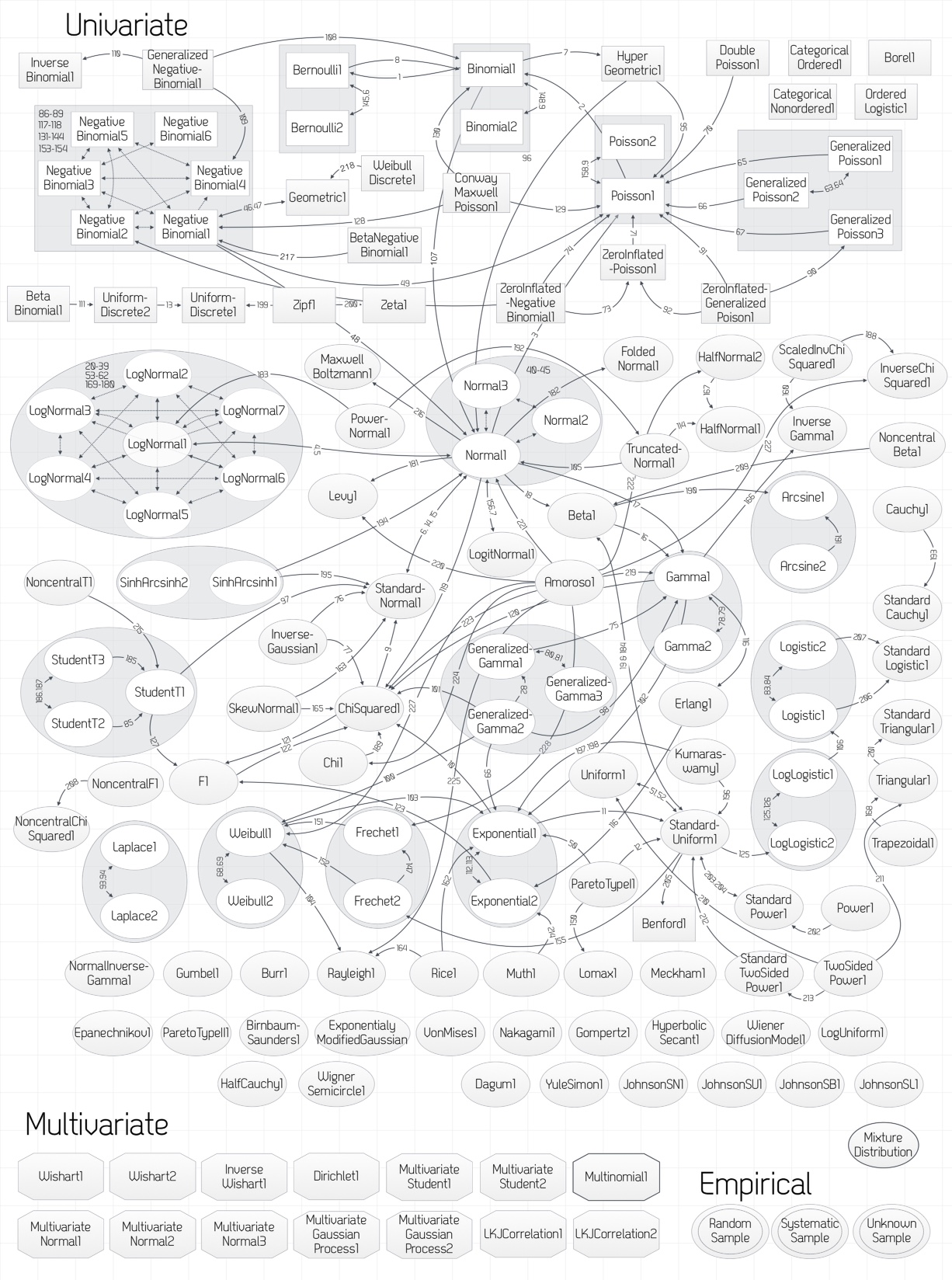
Relationships between univariate probability distributions in ProbOnto.

In probability theory and statistics, there are several relationships among probability distributions. These relations can be categorized in the following groups:

- One distribution is a special case of another with a broader parameter space
- Transforms (function of a random variable);
- Combinations (function of several variables);
- Approximation (limit) relationships;
- Compound relationships (useful for Bayesian inference);
- Duality;
- Conjugate priors.

== Special case of distribution parametrization ==
- A binomial distribution with parameters n = 1 and p is a Bernoulli distribution with parameter p.
- A negative binomial distribution with parameters n = 1 and p is a geometric distribution with parameter p.
- A gamma distribution with shape parameter α = 1 and rate parameter β is an exponential distribution with rate parameter β.
- A gamma distribution with shape parameter α = v/2 and rate parameter β = 1/2 is a chi-squared distribution with ν degrees of freedom.
- A chi-squared distribution with 2 degrees of freedom (k = 2) is an exponential distribution with a mean value of 2 (rate λ = 1/2 .)
- A Weibull distribution with shape parameter k = 1 and rate parameter β is an exponential distribution with rate parameter β.
- A beta distribution with shape parameters α = β = 1 is a continuous uniform distribution over the real numbers 0 to 1.
- A beta-binomial distribution with parameter n and shape parameters α = β = 1 is a discrete uniform distribution over the integers 0 to n.
- A Student's t-distribution with one degree of freedom (v = 1) is a Cauchy distribution with location parameter x = 0 and scale parameter γ = 1.
- A Burr distribution with parameters c = 1 and k (and scale λ) is a Lomax distribution with shape k (and scale λ.)

== Transform of a variable ==
=== Multiple of a random variable ===
Multiplying the variable by any positive real constant yields a scaling of the original distribution. Some are self-replicating, meaning that the scaling yields the same family of distributions, albeit with a different parameter: normal distribution, gamma distribution, Cauchy distribution, exponential distribution, Erlang distribution, Weibull distribution, logistic distribution, error distribution, power-law distribution, Rayleigh distribution.

Example:

- If X is a gamma random variable with shape and rate parameters (α, β), then Y = aX is a gamma random variable with parameters (α,β/a).
- If X is a gamma random variable with shape and scale parameters (α, θ), then Y = aX is a gamma random variable with parameters (α,aθ).

=== Linear function of a random variable ===
The affine transform ax + b yields a relocation and scaling of the original distribution. The following are self-replicating: Normal distribution, Cauchy distribution, Logistic distribution, Error distribution, Power distribution, Rayleigh distribution.

Example:

- If Z is a normal random variable with parameters (μ = m, σ^{2} = s^{2}), then X = aZ + b is a normal random variable with parameters (μ = am + b, σ^{2} = a^{2}s^{2}).

=== Reciprocal of a random variable ===
The reciprocal 1/X of a random variable X, is a member of the same family of distribution as X, in the following cases: Cauchy distribution, F distribution, log logistic distribution.

Examples:

- If X is a Cauchy (μ, σ) random variable, then 1/X is a Cauchy (μ/C, σ/C) random variable where C = μ^{2} + σ^{2}.
- If X is an F(ν_{1}, ν_{2}) random variable then 1/X is an F(ν_{2}, ν_{1}) random variable.

=== Other cases ===
Some distributions are invariant under a specific transformation.

Example:

- If X is a beta (α, β) random variable then (1 − X) is a beta (β, α) random variable.
- If X is a binomial (n, p) random variable then (n − X) is a binomial (n, 1 − p) random variable.
- If X follows a continuous uniform distribution on [0,1], and F_{X}(X) is its cumulative distribution function (CDF), then the random variable U=F_{X}(X) follows a standard uniform distribution on [0,1].

Some distributions are variant under a specific transformation.

- If X is a normal (μ, σ^{2}) random variable then e^{X} is a lognormal (μ, σ^{2}) random variable.

Conversely, if X is a lognormal (μ, σ^{2}) random variable then log X is a normal (μ, σ^{2}) random variable.

- If X is an exponential random variable with mean β, then X^{1/γ} is a Weibull (γ, β) random variable.
- The square of a standard normal random variable has a chi-squared distribution with one degree of freedom.
- If X is a Student’s t random variable with ν degree of freedom, then X^{2} is an F (1,ν) random variable.
- If X is a double exponential random variable with mean 0 and scale λ, then |X| is an exponential random variable with mean λ.
- A geometric random variable is the floor of an exponential random variable.
- A rectangular random variable is the floor of a uniform random variable.
- A reciprocal random variable is the exponential of a uniform random variable.

== Functions of several variables ==
=== Sum of variables ===
The distribution of the sum of independent random variables is the convolution of their distributions. Suppose $Z$ is the sum of $n$ independent random variables $X_1, \dots, X_n$ each with probability mass functions $f_{X_i}(x)$. Then
$$Z = \sum_{i = 1}^{n} {X_i}.$$
If it has a distribution from the same family of distributions as the original variables, that family of distributions is said to be closed under convolution. Often (always?) these distributions are also stable distributions (see also Discrete-stable distribution).

Examples of such univariate distributions are: normal distributions, Poisson distributions, binomial distributions (with common success probability), negative binomial distributions (with common success probability), gamma distributions (with common rate parameter), chi-squared distributions, Cauchy distributions, hyperexponential distributions.

Examples:

  - If X_{1} and X_{2} are Poisson random variables with means μ_{1} and μ_{2} respectively, then X_{1} + X_{2} is a Poisson random variable with mean μ_{1} + μ_{2}.
  - The sum of gamma (α_{i}, β) random variables has a gamma (Σα_{i}, β) distribution.
  - If X_{1} is a Cauchy (μ_{1}, σ_{1}) random variable and X_{2} is a Cauchy (μ_{2}, σ_{2}), then X_{1} + X_{2} is a Cauchy (μ_{1} + μ_{2}, σ_{1} + σ_{2}) random variable.
  - If X_{1} and X_{2} are chi-squared random variables with ν_{1} and ν_{2} degrees of freedom respectively, then X_{1} + X_{2} is a chi-squared random variable with ν_{1} + ν_{2} degrees of freedom.
  - If X_{1} is a normal (μ_{1}, σ^{2}_{1}) random variable and X_{2} is a normal (μ_{2}, σ^{2}_{2}) random variable, then X_{1} + X_{2} is a normal (μ_{1} + μ_{2}, σ^{2}_{1} + σ^{2}_{2}) random variable.
  - The sum of N chi-squared (1) random variables has a chi-squared distribution with N degrees of freedom.

Other distributions are not closed under convolution, but their sum has a known distribution:

- The sum of n Bernoulli (p) random variables is a binomial (n, p) random variable.
- The sum of n geometric random variables with probability of success p is a negative binomial random variable with parameters n and p.
- The sum of n exponential (β) random variables is a gamma (n, β) random variable. Since n is an integer, the gamma distribution is also a Erlang distribution.
- The sum of the squares of N standard normal random variables has a chi-squared distribution with N degrees of freedom.

=== Product of variables ===
The product of independent random variables X and Y may belong to the same family of distribution as X and Y: Bernoulli distribution and log-normal distribution.

Example:

- If X_{1} and X_{2} are independent log-normal random variables with parameters (μ_{1}, σ^{2}_{1}) and (μ_{2}, σ^{2}_{2}) respectively, then X_{1} X_{2} is a log-normal random variable with parameters (μ_{1} + μ_{2}, σ^{2}_{1} + σ^{2}_{2}).

=== Minimum and maximum of independent random variables ===
For some distributions, the minimum value of several independent random variables is a member of the same family, with different parameters: Bernoulli distribution, Geometric distribution, Exponential distribution, Extreme value distribution, Pareto distribution, Rayleigh distribution, Weibull distribution.

Examples:

- If X_{1} and X_{2} are independent geometric random variables with probability of success p_{1} and p_{2} respectively, then min(X_{1}, X_{2}) is a geometric random variable with probability of success p = p_{1} + p_{2} − p_{1} p_{2}. The relationship is simpler if expressed in terms probability of failure: q = q_{1} q_{2}.
- If X_{1} and X_{2} are independent exponential random variables with rate μ_{1} and μ_{2} respectively, then min(X_{1}, X_{2}) is an exponential random variable with rate μ = μ_{1} + μ_{2}.

Similarly, distributions for which the maximum value of several independent random variables is a member of the same family of distribution include: Bernoulli distribution, Power law distribution.

=== Other ===
- If X and Y are independent standard normal random variables, X/Y is a Cauchy (0,1) random variable.
- If X_{1} and X_{2} are independent chi-squared random variables with ν_{1} and ν_{2} degrees of freedom respectively, then (X_{1}/ν_{1})/(X_{2}/ν_{2}) is an F(ν_{1}, ν_{2}) random variable.
- If X is a standard normal random variable and U is an independent chi-squared random variable with ν degrees of freedom, then $\frac{X}{\sqrt{(U/\nu)}}$ is a Student's t(ν) random variable.
- If X_{1} is a gamma (α_{1}, 1) random variable and X_{2} is an independent gamma (α_{2}, 1) random variable then X_{1}/(X_{1} + X_{2}) is a beta(α_{1}, α_{2}) random variable. More generally, if X_{1} is a gamma(α_{1}, β_{1}) random variable and X_{2} is an independent gamma(α_{2}, β_{2}) random variable then β_{2} X_{1}/(β_{2} X_{1} + β_{1} X_{2}) is a beta(α_{1}, α_{2}) random variable.
- If X and Y are independent exponential random variables with mean μ, then X − Y is a double exponential random variable with mean 0 and scale μ.
- If X_{i} are independent Bernoulli random variables then their parity (XOR) is a Bernoulli variable described by the piling-up lemma.

== Approximate (limit) relationships ==
Approximate or limit relationship means

- either that the combination of an infinite number of iid random variables tends to some distribution,
- or that the limit when a parameter tends to some value approaches to a different distribution.

Combination of iid random variables:

- Given certain conditions, the sum (hence the average) of a sufficiently large number of iid random variables, each with finite mean and variance, will be approximately normally distributed. This is the central limit theorem (CLT).

Special case of distribution parametrization:

- X is a hypergeometric (m, N, n) random variable. If n and m are large compared to N, and p = m/N is not close to 0 or 1, then X approximately has a Binomial(n, p) distribution.
- X is a beta-binomial random variable with parameters (n, α, β). Let p = α/(α + β) and suppose α + β is large, then X approximately has a binomial(n, p) distribution.
- If X is a binomial (n, p) random variable and if n is large and np is small then X approximately has a Poisson(np) distribution.
- If X is a negative binomial random variable with r large, P near 1, and r(1 − P) = λ, then X approximately has a Poisson distribution with mean λ.

Consequences of the CLT:

- If X is a Poisson random variable with large mean, then for integers j and k, P(j ≤ X ≤ k) approximately equals to P(j − 1/2 ≤ Y ≤ k + 1/2) where Y is a normal distribution with the same mean and variance as X.
- If X is a binomial(n, p) random variable with large np and n(1 − p), then for integers j and k, P(j ≤ X ≤ k) approximately equals to P(j − 1/2 ≤ Y ≤ k + 1/2) where Y is a normal random variable with the same mean and variance as X, i.e. np and np(1 − p).
- If X is a beta random variable with parameters α and β equal and large, then X approximately has a normal distribution with the same mean and variance, i. e. mean α/(α + β) and variance αβ/((α + β)^{2}(α + β + 1)).
- If X is a gamma(α, β) random variable and the shape parameter α is large relative to the scale parameter β, then X approximately has a normal random variable with the same mean and variance.
- If X is a Student's t random variable with a large number of degrees of freedom ν then X approximately has a standard normal distribution.
- If X is an F(ν, ω) random variable with ω large, then νX is approximately distributed as a chi-squared random variable with ν degrees of freedom.

== Compound (or Bayesian) relationships ==
When one or more parameter(s) of a distribution are random variables, the compound distribution is the marginal distribution of the variable.

Examples:

- If X | N is a binomial (N,p) random variable, where parameter N is a random variable with negative-binomial (m, r) distribution, then X is distributed as a negative-binomial (m, r/(p + qr)).
- If X | N is a binomial (N,p) random variable, where parameter N is a random variable with Poisson(μ) distribution, then X is distributed as a Poisson (μp).
- If X | μ is a Poisson(μ) random variable and parameter μ is random variable with gamma(m, θ) distribution (where θ is the scale parameter), then X is distributed as a negative-binomial (m, θ/(1 + θ)), sometimes called gamma-Poisson distribution.

Some distributions have been specially named as compounds: beta-binomial distribution, Beta negative binomial distribution, gamma-normal distribution.

Examples:

- If X is a Binomial(n,p) random variable, and parameter p is a random variable with beta(α, β) distribution, then X is distributed as a Beta-Binomial(α,β,n).
- If X is a negative-binomial(r,p) random variable, and parameter p is a random variable with beta(α,β) distribution, then X is distributed as a Beta negative binomial distribution(r,α,β).

== See also ==
- Central limit theorem
- Compound probability distribution
- List of convolutions of probability distributions
