= Hammock plot =

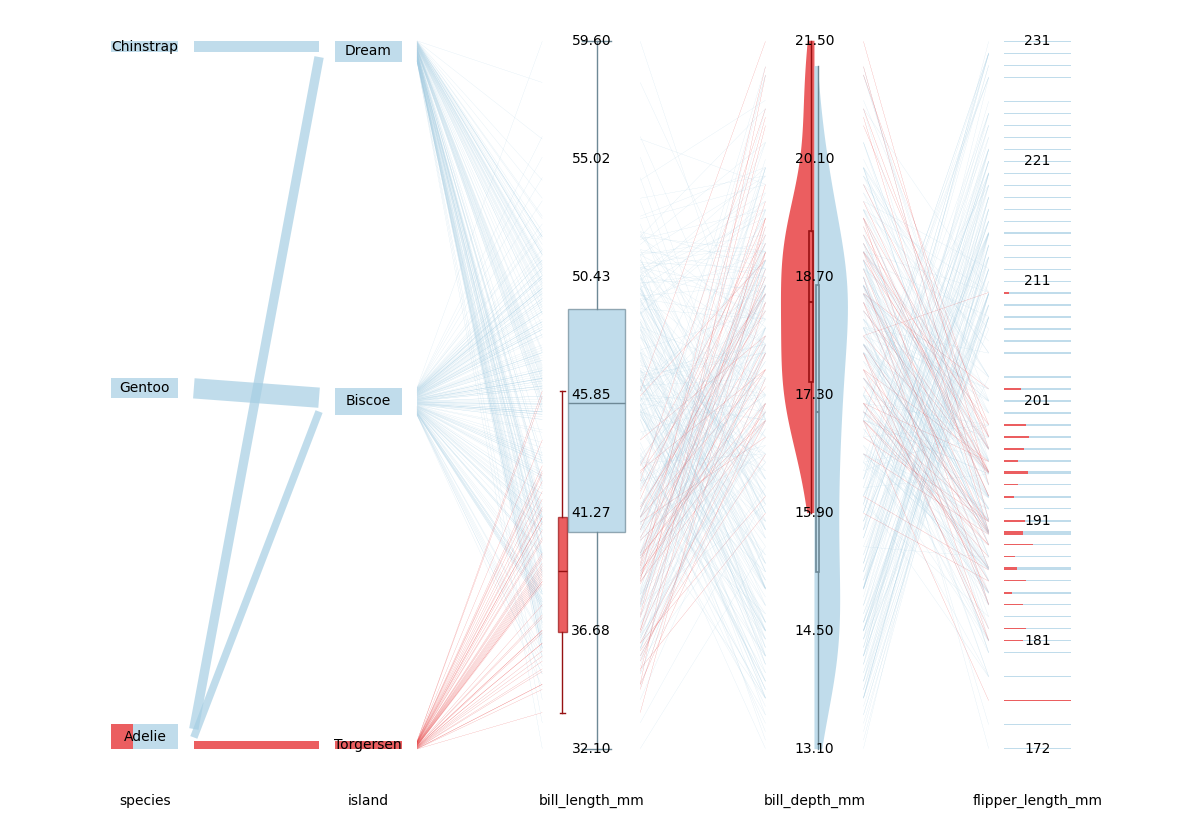
Example of a hammock plot. The variables "species" and "island" are categorical variables. "Bill length mm", "bill depth mm", and "flipper length mm" are numerical variables. They are represented by a boxplot, a violin plot, and a rugplot, respectively. The value "Torgersen" from the "island" variable is highlighted. This image was generated using the Palmer penguins dataset

A hammock plot is a multivariate visualization that displays numerical and categorical variables along parallel axes. Each variable occupies a vertical axis whose sections represent the distribution of values. Adjacent variables are connected by bands whose thicknesses are proportional to the number of observations belonging to each pair of values, revealing the joint distribution. Hammock plots consistently follow strict proportions across variables and connectors, so that joint distributions are easy to see. Values can be highlighted to trace their conditional distribution across all variables.

Hammock plots are particularly useful for visualizing patterns across multiple variables.
