= Richard Neapolitan =

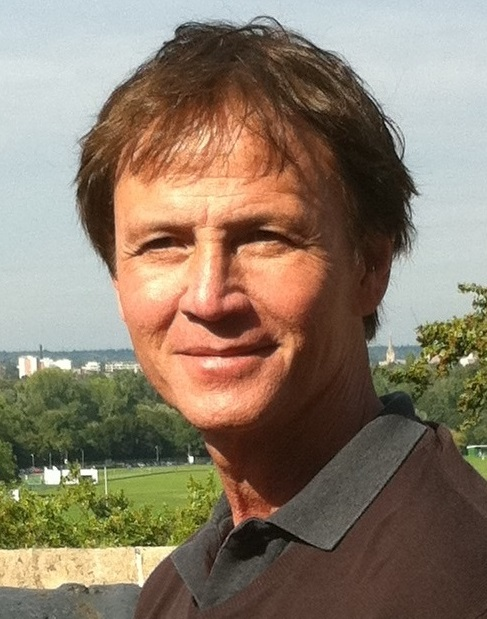
- Born: Richard Eugene Neapolitan; Berwyn, Illinois
- Died: January 29, 2020
- Education: University of Illinois (BS); Illinois Institute of Technology (MS, PhD)
- Scientific career
- Fields: mathematics computer science

Richard Eugene Neapolitan was an American scientist. Neapolitan is most well-known for his role in establishing the use of probability theory in artificial intelligence and in the development of the field Bayesian networks.

== Biography ==
Neapolitan grew up in the 1950s and 1960s in Westchester, Illinois, which is a western suburb of Chicago. He received a Ph.D. in mathematics from the Illinois Institute of Technology. Neapolitan notes that he was unable to obtain an academic position after obtaining his Ph.D., owing to a glut of mathematicians and a recession in the 1970s, and so he worked as a model and in various computer science related positions. The latter experience enabled him to obtain a faculty position in the Computer Science Department of Northeastern Illinois University (NEIU) in 1980. He served the majority of his academic career at NEIU, including becoming Chair of Computer Science in 2002.

He died on January 29, 2020, due to cancer.

== Research ==
In the 1980s, researchers from cognitive science (e.g., Judea Pearl), computer science (e.g., Peter C. Cheeseman and Lotfi Zadeh), decision analysis (e.g., Ross Shachter), medicine (e.g., David Heckerman and Gregory Cooper), mathematics and statistics (e.g., Neapolitan, Tod Levitt, and David Spiegelhalter) and philosophy (e.g., Henry Kyburg) met at the newly formed Workshop on Uncertainty in Artificial Intelligence to discuss how to best perform uncertain inference in artificial intelligence. Neapolitan presented an exposition on the use of the classical approach to probability versus the Bayesian approach in artificial intelligence at the 1988 Workshop. A more extensive philosophical treatise on the difference between the two approaches and the application of probability to artificial intelligence appeared in his 1989 text Probabilistic Reasoning in Expert Systems: Theory and Algorithms.

Closely related to the issue of representing uncertainty in artificial intelligence, researchers at the Workshop on Uncertainty in Artificial Intelligence developed and discussed graphical models that could represent large joint probability distributions. Neapolitan formulated these efforts into a coherent field in the text Probabilistic Reasoning in Expert Systems: Theory and Algorithms. The text defines a causal (Bayesian) network, and proves a theorem showing that a directed acyclic graph $G$ and a discrete probability distribution $P$ together constitute a Bayesian network if and only if $P$ is equal to the product of its conditional distributions in $G$. The text also includes methods for doing inference in Bayesian networks, and a discussion of influence diagrams, which are Bayesian networks augmented with decision nodes and a value node. Many AI applications have since been developed using Bayesian networks and influence diagrams.

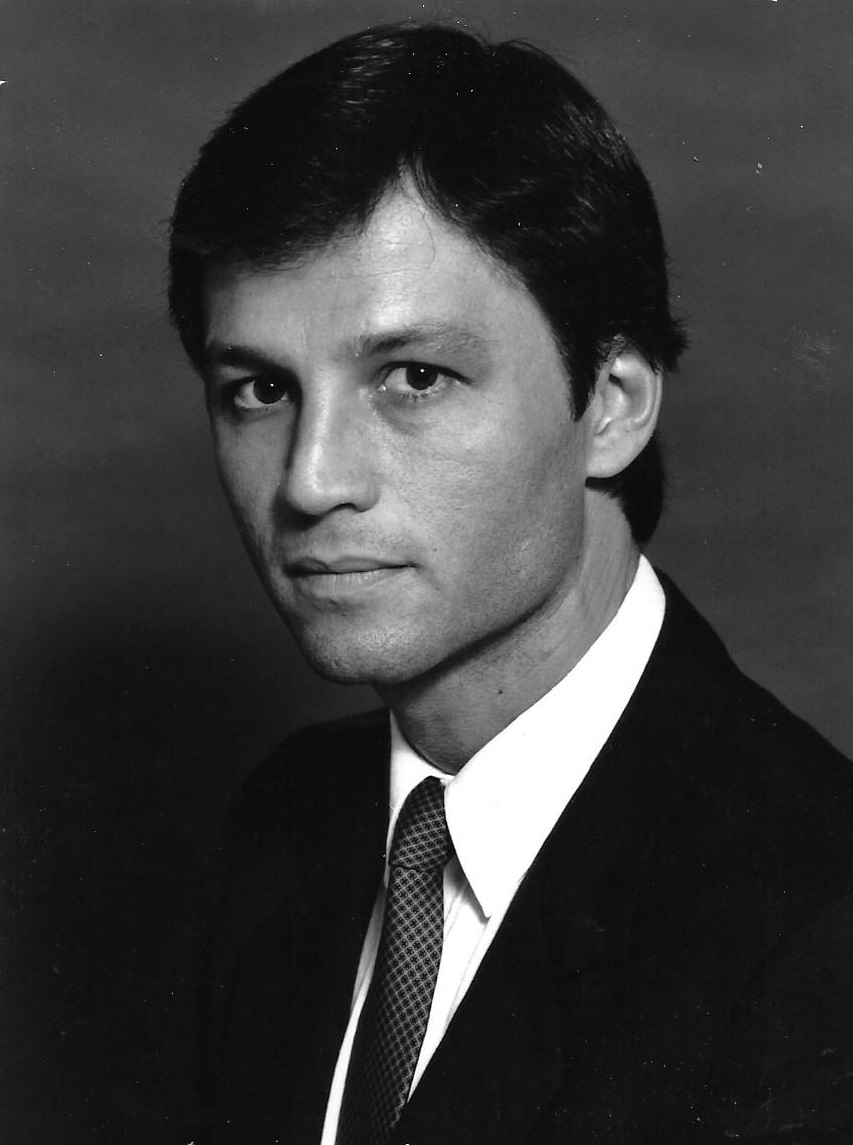
Neapolitan in 1980

Neapolitan's "Probabilistic Reasoning in Expert Systems" and Judea Pearl's "Probabilistic Reasoning in Intelligent Systems" have been widely recognized as formalizing the field of Bayesian networks, as seen in the works of Eugene Charniak, who, in 1991, noted both texts as the source for Bayesian network inference algorithms; P.W. Jones, who wrote a review of "Probabilistic Reasoning in Expert Systems"in 1992; Cooper and Herskovits, who credit Neapolitan's text and Pearl's text for formalizing the theory of belief networks in their 1992 paper that developed the score-based method for learning Bayesian networks from data; and Simon Parsons, who, in 1995, compared the two texts and discussed their roles in establishing the field of probabilistic networks. More recently, in 2008, Dawn Holmes discussed Neapolitan's career and the contribution of his first text.

In the 1990s researchers strived to develop methods that could learn Bayesian networks from data. Neapolitan assimilated these efforts in the 2003 text Learning Bayesian Networks, which is the first book addressing learning Bayesian networks. Other Bayesian network books that Neapolitan authored include Probabilistic Methods for Financial and Marketing Informatics, which applies Bayesian networks to problems in finance and marketing; and Probabilistic Methods for Bioinformatics, which applies Bayesian networks to problems in biology. Neapolitan has also written Foundations of Algorithms and (with Xia Jiang) Artificial Intelligence: With an Introduction to Machine Learning.
