= Conditional dependence =

Concept in probability theory

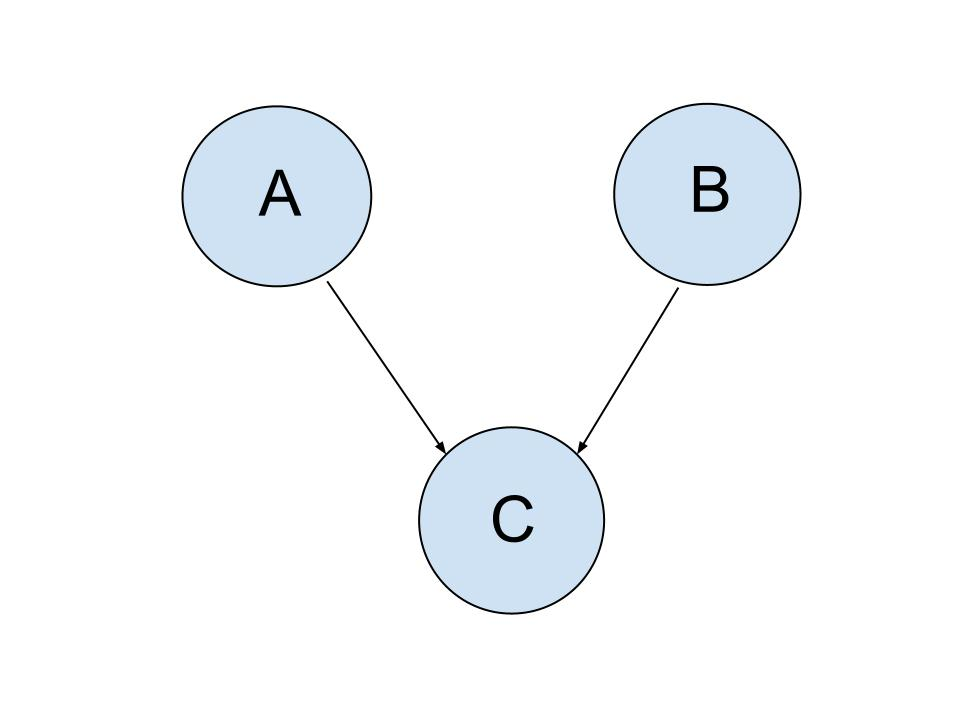
A Bayesian network illustrating conditional dependence

In probability theory, conditional dependence is a relationship between two or more events that are dependent when a third event occurs. It is the opposite of conditional independence. For example, if $A$ and $B$ are two events that individually increase the probability of a third event $C,$ and do not directly affect each other, then initially (when it has not been observed whether or not the event $C$ occurs)
$$\operatorname{P}(A \mid B) = \operatorname{P}(A) \quad \text{ and } \quad \operatorname{P}(B \mid A) = \operatorname{P}(B)$$
($A \text{ and } B$ are independent).

But suppose that now $C$ is observed to occur. If event $B$ occurs then the probability of occurrence of the event $A$ will decrease because its positive relation to $C$ is less necessary as an explanation for the occurrence of $C$ (similarly, event $A$ occurring will decrease the probability of occurrence of $B$). Hence, now the two events $A$ and $B$ are conditionally negatively dependent on each other because the probability of occurrence of each is negatively dependent on whether the other occurs. We have
$$\operatorname{P}(A \mid C \text{ and } B) < \operatorname{P}(A \mid C).$$

Conditional dependence of A and B given C is the logical negation of conditional independence $((A \perp\!\!\!\perp B) \mid C)$. In conditional independence two events (which may be dependent or not) become independent given the occurrence of a third event.

== Example ==
In essence probability is influenced by a person's information about the possible occurrence of an event. For example, let the event $A$ be 'I have a new phone'; event $B$ be 'I have a new watch'; and event $C$ be 'I am happy'; and suppose that having either a new phone or a new watch increases the probability of my being happy. Let us assume that the event $C$ has occurred – meaning 'I am happy'. Now if another person sees my new watch, he/she will reason that my likelihood of being happy was increased by my new watch, so there is less need to attribute my happiness to a new phone.

To make the example more numerically specific, suppose that there are four possible states $\Omega = \left\{ s_1, s_2, s_3, s_4 \right\},$ given in the middle four columns of the following table, in which the occurrence of event $A$ is signified by a $1$ in row $A$ and its non-occurrence is signified by a $0,$ and likewise for $B$ and $C.$ That is, $A = \left\{ s_2, s_4 \right\}, B = \left\{ s_3, s_4 \right\},$ and $C = \left\{ s_2, s_3, s_4 \right\}.$ The probability of $s_i$ is $1/4$ for every $i.$

| Event | $\operatorname{P}(s_1)=1/4$ | $\operatorname{P}(s_2)=1/4$ | $\operatorname{P}(s_3)=1/4$ | $\operatorname{P}(s_4)=1/4$ | Probability of event |
|---|---|---|---|---|---|
| $A$ | 0 | 1 | 0 | 1 | $\tfrac{1}{2}$ |
| $B$ | 0 | 0 | 1 | 1 | $\tfrac{1}{2}$ |
| $C$ | 0 | 1 | 1 | 1 | $\tfrac{3}{4}$ |

and so

| Event | $s_1$ | $s_2$ | $s_3$ | $s_4$ | Probability of event |
|---|---|---|---|---|---|
| $A \cap B$ | 0 | 0 | 0 | 1 | $\tfrac{1}{4}$ |
| $A \cap C$ | 0 | 1 | 0 | 1 | $\tfrac{1}{2}$ |
| $B \cap C$ | 0 | 0 | 1 | 1 | $\tfrac{1}{2}$ |
| $A \cap B \cap C$ | 0 | 0 | 0 | 1 | $\tfrac{1}{4}$ |

In this example, $C$ occurs if and only if at least one of $A, B$ occurs. Unconditionally (that is, without reference to $C$), $A$ and $B$ are independent of each other because $\operatorname{P}(A)$—the sum of the probabilities associated with a $1$ in row $A$—is $\tfrac{1}{2},$ while
$$\operatorname{P}(A\mid B) = \operatorname{P}(A \text{ and } B) / \operatorname{P}(B) = \tfrac{1/4}{1/2} = \tfrac{1}{2} = \operatorname{P}(A).$$
But conditional on $C$ having occurred (the last three columns in the table), we have
$$\operatorname{P}(A \mid C) = \operatorname{P}(A \text{ and } C) / \operatorname{P}(C) = \tfrac{1/2}{3/4} = \tfrac{2}{3}$$
while
$$\operatorname{P}(A \mid C \text{ and } B) = \operatorname{P}(A \text{ and } C \text{ and } B) / \operatorname{P}(C \text{ and } B) = \tfrac{1/4}{1/2} = \tfrac{1}{2} < \operatorname{P}(A \mid C).$$
Since in the presence of $C$ the probability of $A$ is affected by the presence or absence of $B, A$ and $B$ are mutually dependent conditional on $C.$

== See also ==
- Conditional independence – Probability theory concept
- de Finetti's theorem – Conditional independence of exchangeable observations
- Conditional expectation – Expected value of a random variable given that certain conditions are known to occur
