= Lifting theory =

Notion in measure theory

In mathematics, lifting theory was first introduced by John von Neumann in a pioneering paper from 1931, in which he answered a question raised by Alfréd Haar. The theory was further developed by Dorothy Maharam (1958) and by Alexandra Ionescu Tulcea and Cassius Ionescu Tulcea (1961). Lifting theory was motivated to a large extent by its striking applications. Its development up to 1969 was described in a monograph of the Ionescu Tulceas. Lifting theory continued to develop since then, yielding new results and applications.

== Definitions ==
A lifting on a measure space $(X, \Sigma, \mu)$ is a linear and multiplicative operator
$$T : L^\infty(X, \Sigma, \mu) \to \mathcal{L}^\infty(X, \Sigma, \mu)$$
which is a right inverse of the quotient map
$$\begin{cases}
\mathcal L^\infty(X,\Sigma,\mu) \to L^\infty(X,\Sigma,\mu) \\
f \mapsto [f]
\end{cases}$$

where $\mathcal{L}^\infty(X,\Sigma,\mu)$ is the seminormed L^{p} space of measurable functions and $L^\infty(X, \Sigma, \mu)$ is its usual normed quotient. In other words, a lifting picks from every equivalence class $[f]$ of bounded measurable functions modulo negligible functions a representative— which is henceforth written $T([f])$ or $T[f]$ or simply $Tf$ — in such a way that $T[1] = 1$ and for all $p \in X$ and all $r, s \in \Reals,$
$$T(r[f]+s[g])(p) = rT[f](p) + sT[g](p),$$
$$T([f]\times[g])(p) = T[f](p) \times T[g](p).$$

Liftings are used to produce disintegrations of measures, for instance conditional probability distributions given continuous random variables, and fibrations of Lebesgue measure on the level sets of a function.

== Existence of liftings ==
Theorem. Suppose $(X, \Sigma, \mu)$ is complete. Then $(X, \Sigma, \mu)$ admits a lifting if and only if there exists a collection of mutually disjoint integrable sets in $\Sigma$ whose union is $X.$ In particular, if $(X, \Sigma, \mu)$ is the completion of a σ-finite measure or of an inner regular Borel measure on a locally compact space, then $(X, \Sigma, \mu)$ admits a lifting.

The proof consists in extending a lifting to ever larger sub-σ-algebras, applying Doob's martingale convergence theorem if one encounters a countable chain in the process.

== Strong liftings ==
Suppose $(X, \Sigma, \mu)$ is complete and $X$ is equipped with a completely regular Hausdorff topology $\tau \subseteq \Sigma$ such that the union of any collection of negligible open sets is again negligible – this is the case if $(X, \Sigma, \mu)$ is σ-finite or comes from a Radon measure. Then the support of $\mu,$ $\operatorname{Supp}(\mu),$ can be defined as the complement of the largest negligible open subset, and the collection $C_b(X, \tau)$ of bounded continuous functions belongs to $\mathcal L^\infty(X, \Sigma, \mu).$

A strong lifting for $(X, \Sigma, \mu)$ is a lifting
$$T : L^\infty(X, \Sigma, \mu) \to \mathcal{L}^\infty(X, \Sigma, \mu)$$
such that $T\varphi = \varphi$ on $\operatorname{Supp}(\mu)$ for all $\varphi$ in $C_b(X, \tau).$ This is the same as requiring that $T U \geq (U \cap \operatorname{Supp}(\mu))$ for all open sets $U$ in $\tau.$

Theorem. If $(\Sigma, \mu)$ is σ-finite and complete and $\tau$ has a countable basis then $(X, \Sigma, \mu)$ admits a strong lifting.

Proof. Let $T_0$ be a lifting for $(X, \Sigma, \mu)$ and $U_1, U_2, \ldots$ a countable basis for $\tau.$ For any point $p$ in the negligible set
$$N := \bigcup\nolimits_n \left\{p \in \operatorname{Supp}(\mu) : (T_0U_n)(p) < U_n(p)\right\}$$
let $T_p$ be any character on $L^\infty(X, \Sigma, \mu)$ that extends the character $\phi \mapsto \phi(p)$ of $C_b(X, \tau).$ Then for $p$ in $X$ and $[f]$ in $L^\infty(X, \Sigma, \mu)$ define:
$$(T[f])(p):= \begin{cases} (T_0[f])(p)& p\notin N\\
T_p[f]& p\in N.
\end{cases}$$
$T$ is the desired strong lifting.

== Application: disintegration of a measure ==
Suppose $(X, \Sigma, \mu)$ and $(Y, \Phi, \nu)$ are σ-finite measure spaces ($\mu, \nu$ positive) and $\pi : X \to Y$ is a measurable map. A disintegration of $\mu$ along $\pi$ with respect to $\nu$ is a slew $Y \ni y \mapsto \lambda_y$ of positive σ-additive measures on $(\Sigma, \mu)$ such that

1. $\lambda_y$ is carried by the fiber $\pi^{-1}(\{y\})$ of $\pi$ over $y$, i.e. $\{y\} \in \Phi$ and $\lambda_y\left((X\setminus \pi^{-1}(\{y\})\right) = 0$ for almost all $y \in Y$
2. for every $\mu$-integrable function $f,$
  $$\int_X f(p)\;\mu(dp)= \int_Y \left(\int_{\pi^{-1}(\{y\})} f(p)\,\lambda_y(dp)\right) \nu(dy) \qquad (*)$$
  in the sense that, for $\nu$-almost all $y$ in $Y,$ $f$ is $\lambda_y$-integrable, the function
  $$y \mapsto \int_{\pi^{-1}(\{y\})} f(p)\,\lambda_y(dp)$$
  is $\nu$-integrable, and the displayed equality $(*)$ holds.

Disintegrations exist in various circumstances, the proofs varying but almost all using strong liftings. Here is a rather general result. Its short proof gives the general flavor.

Theorem. Suppose $X$ is a Polish space and $Y$ a separable Hausdorff space, both equipped with their Borel σ-algebras. Let $\mu$ be a σ-finite Borel measure on $X$ and $\pi : X \to Y$ a $\Sigma, \Phi-$measurable map. Then there exists a σ-finite Borel measure $\nu$ on $Y$ and a disintegration (*). If $\mu$ is finite, $\nu$ can be taken to be the pushforward $\pi_* \mu,$ and then the $\lambda_y$ are probabilities.

Proof. Because of the polish nature of $X$ there is a sequence of compact subsets of $X$ that are mutually disjoint, whose union has negligible complement, and on which $\pi$ is continuous. This observation reduces the problem to the case that both $X$ and $Y$ are compact and $\pi$ is continuous, and $\nu = \pi_* \mu.$ Complete $\Phi$ under $\nu$ and fix a strong lifting $T$ for $(Y, \Phi, \nu).$ Given a bounded $\mu$-measurable function $f,$ let $\lfloor f\rfloor$ denote its conditional expectation under $\pi,$ that is, the Radon-Nikodym derivative of $\pi_*(f \mu)$ with respect to $\pi_* \mu.$ Then set, for every $y$ in $Y,$ $\lambda_y(f) := T(\lfloor f\rfloor)(y).$ To show that this defines a disintegration is a matter of bookkeeping and a suitable Fubini theorem. To see how the strongness of the lifting enters, note that
$$\lambda_y(f \cdot \varphi \circ \pi) = \varphi(y) \lambda_y(f) \qquad \forall y\in Y, \varphi \in C_b(Y), f \in L^\infty(X, \Sigma, \mu)$$
and take the infimum over all positive $\varphi$ in $C_b(Y)$ with $\varphi(y) = 1;$ it becomes apparent that the support of $\lambda_y$ lies in the fiber over $y.$

== See also ==
- Disintegration theorem
- Ionescu-Tulcea theorem – Probability theorem
- Joint probability distribution – Type of probability distribution
- Copula (statistics) – Statistical distribution for dependence between random variables
- Conditional expectation – Expected value of a random variable given that certain conditions are known to occur
- Borel–Kolmogorov paradox – Conditional probability paradox
- Regular conditional probability
