= Roger Jones (mathematician) =

American mathematician

Roger L. Jones is an American mathematician specializing in harmonic analysis and ergodic theory.

== Biography ==
He obtained a B.S. in mathematics in 1971 from University at Albany, SUNY, and a Ph.D. in mathematics in 1974 from Rutgers University, with thesis Inequalities for the Ergodic Maximal Function written under the direction of Richard Floyd Gundy. He has recently retired from a professorship in mathematics at DePaul University in Chicago. There he taught everything from remedial math to graduate-level courses. During his tenure at DePaul, Roger published numerous research papers in math, was awarded an excellence in teaching award, chaired the DePaul University Mathematics Department, and was awarded National Science Foundation grants related to teaching mathematics. He has also worked with the Chicago Public Schools on improving math instruction.

Roger was honored for his research work at the International Conference on Harmonic Analysis and Ergodic theory that was held in the name of Roger and his colleague Marshall Ash.

Roger has since retired from teaching at DePaul and moved to Northern Wisconsin, where he teaches mathematics at Conserve School.

== Appointments ==
- 1974-1977: DePaul University, Assistant Professor
- 1977-1984: DePaul University, Associate Professor
- 1982-1985: DePaul University, Chairman: Department of Mathematics
- 1984-2004: DePaul University, Professor
- 2004–present: DePaul University, Professor Emeritus

== Professional memberships ==
- Mathematical Association of America
- American Mathematical Society

== Publications ==
- Bellow, Alexandra; Jones, Roger; Rosenblatt, Joseph (1990). "Convergence for moving averages". Ergodic Theory and Dynamical Systems. 10 (1): 43–62. doi:10.1017/s0143385700005381. MR 1053798.
- Bellow, Alexandra; Jones, Roger L., eds. (1991). Almost Everywhere Convergence II. Proceedings of the Second International Conference on Almost Everywhere Convergence in Probability and Ergodic Theory held at Northwestern University, Evanston, Illinois, October 16–20, 1989. Boston, MA: Academic Press. doi:10.1016/c2013-0-10351-0. ISBN 9780120855209. MR 1131778.
- Bellow, Alexandra; Akcoglu, Mustafa; Jones, Roger; Losert, Viktor; Reinhold-Larsson, Karin; Wierdl, Máté (1996). "The strong sweeping out property for lacunary sequences, Riemann sums, convolution powers and related matters". Ergodic Theory and Dynamical Systems. 16 (2): 207–253. doi:10.1017/S0143385700008798. MR 1389623. S2CID 120207520.
