= Alexandra Bellow =

Romanian-American mathematician (1935–2025)

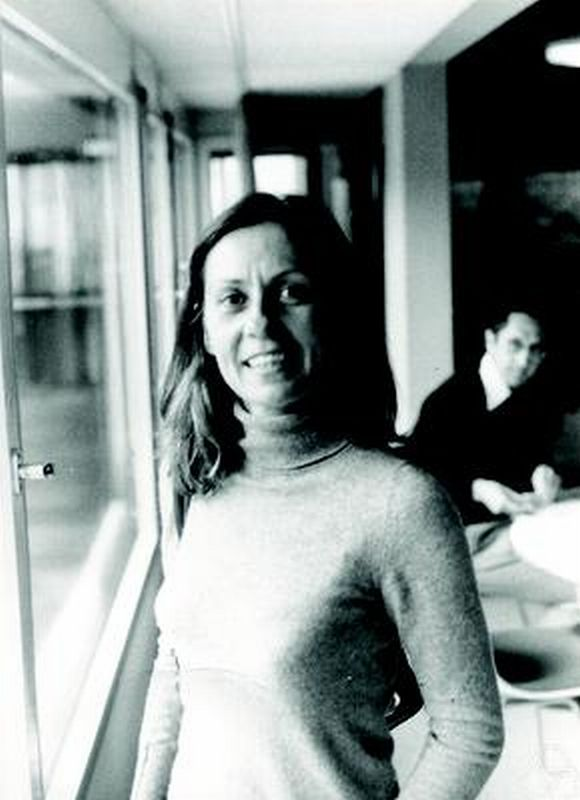
- Bellow in 1975
- Born: Alexandra Bagdasar; August 30, 1935; Bucharest, Romania
- Died: May 2, 2025 (aged 89); Chicago, Illinois, U.S.
- Education: University of Bucharest; Yale University
- Spouses: Cassius Ionescu-Tulcea (m. 1956; div. 1969) Saul Bellow (m. 1974; div. 1985) Alberto Calderón (m. 1989; died 1998)
- Scientific career
- Fields: Mathematics
- Workplaces: University of Pennsylvania; University of Illinois at Urbana–Champaign; Northwestern University
- Thesis: Ergodic Theory of Random Series (1959)
- Doctoral advisor: Shizuo Kakutani

Alexandra Bellow (née Bagdasar; previously Ionescu Tulcea; August 30, 1935 – May 2, 2025) was a Romanian-American mathematician who made contributions to the fields of ergodic theory, probability and analysis.

== Biography ==
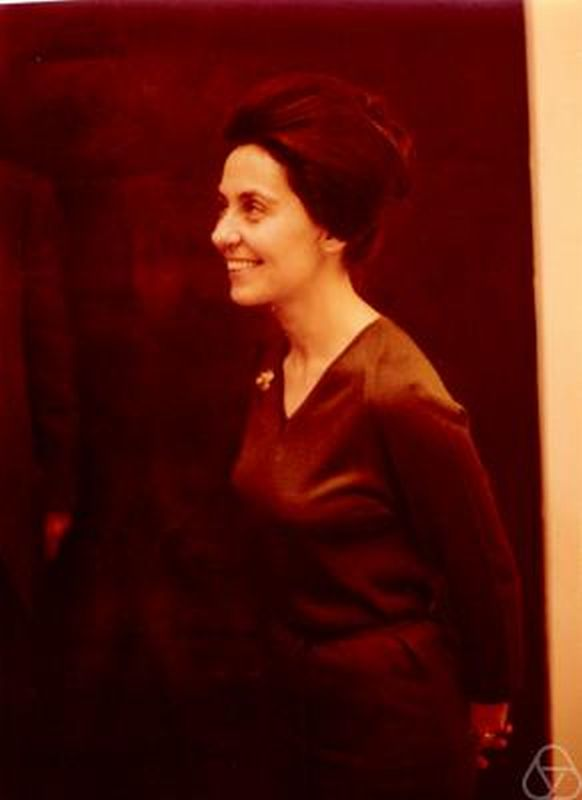
Columbus, Ohio, 1970

Bellow was born in Bucharest, Romania, on August 30, 1935, as Alexandra Bagdasar. Her parents were both physicians. Her mother, Florica Bagdasar (née Ciumetti), was a child psychiatrist. Her father, Dumitru Bagdasar, was a neurosurgeon. She received her M.S. in mathematics from the University of Bucharest in 1957, where she met and married her first husband, mathematician Cassius Ionescu-Tulcea. She accompanied her husband to the United States in 1957 and received her Ph.D. from Yale University in 1959 under the direction of Shizuo Kakutani with thesis Ergodic Theory of Random Series. After receiving her degree, she worked as a research associate at Yale from 1959 until 1961, and as an assistant professor at the University of Pennsylvania from 1962 to 1964. From 1964 until 1967, she was an associate professor at the University of Illinois at Urbana–Champaign. In 1967, she moved to Northwestern University as a Professor of Mathematics. She was at Northwestern until her retirement in 1996, when she became Professor Emeritus.

During her marriage to Cassius Ionescu-Tulcea (1956–1969), she and her husband co-wrote many papers and a research monograph on lifting theory.

Alexandra's second husband was the writer Saul Bellow, who was awarded the Nobel Prize in Literature in 1976, during their marriage (1975–1985). Alexandra features in Bellow's writings; she is portrayed lovingly in his memoir To Jerusalem and Back (1976), and, his novel The Dean's December (1982), more critically, satirically in his last novel, Ravelstein (2000), which was written many years after their divorce. The decade of the nineties was for Alexandra a period of personal and professional fulfillment, brought about by her marriage in 1989 to the mathematician Alberto P. Calderón.

Bellow died in Chicago, Illinois on May 2, 2025, at the age of 89.

== Mathematical work ==
=== Lifting theory ===
Some of her early work involved properties and consequences of lifting. Lifting theory, which had started with the pioneering papers of John von Neumann and later Dorothy Maharam, came into its own in the 1960s and 1970s with the work of the Ionescu Tulceas and provided the definitive treatment for the representation theory of linear operators arising in probability, the process of disintegration of measures. Their Ergebnisse monograph from 1969 became a standard reference in this area.

By applying a lifting to a stochastic process, the Ionescu Tulceas obtained a ‘separable’ process; this gives a rapid proof of Joseph Leo Doob's theorem concerning the existence of a separable modification of a stochastic process (also a ‘canonical’ way of obtaining the separable modification). Furthermore, by applying a lifting to a ‘weakly’ measurable function with values in a weakly compact set of a Banach space, one obtains a strongly measurable function; this gives a one line proof of Phillips's classical theorem (also a ‘canonical’ way of obtaining the strongly measurable version).

We say that a set H of measurable functions satisfies the "separation property" if any two distinct functions in H belong to distinct equivalence classes. The range of a lifting is always a set of measurable functions with the "separation property". The following ‘metrization criterion’ gives some idea why the functions in the range of a lifting are so much better behaved. Let H be a set of measurable functions with the following properties: (I) H is compact (for the topology of pointwise convergence); (II) H is convex; (III) H satisfies the "separation property". Then H is metrizable. The proof of the existence of a lifting commuting with the left translations of an arbitrary locally compact group, by the Ionescu Tulceas, is highly non-trivial; it makes use of approximation by Lie groups, and martingale-type arguments tailored to the group structure.

=== Martingales ===
In the early 1960s, she worked with C. Ionescu Tulcea on martingales taking values in a Banach space. In a certain sense, this work launched the study of vector-valued martingales, with the first proof of the ‘strong’ almost everywhere convergence for martingales taking values in a Banach space with (what later became known as) the Radon–Nikodym property; this, by the way, opened the doors to a new area of analysis, the "geometry of Banach spaces". These ideas were later extended by Bellow to the theory of ‘uniform amarts’, (in the context of Banach spaces, uniform amarts are the natural generalization of martingales, quasi-martingales and possess remarkable stability properties, such as optional sampling), now an important chapter in probability theory.

=== Ergodic theory ===
In 1960, Donald Samuel Ornstein constructed an example of a non-singular transformation on the Lebesgue space of the unit interval, which does not admit a $\sigma$–finite invariant measure equivalent to Lebesgue measure, thus solving a long-standing problem in ergodic theory. A few years later, Rafael V. Chacón gave an example of a positive (linear) isometry of $L_1$ for which the individual ergodic theorem fails in $L_1$. Her work unifies and extends these two remarkable results. It shows, by methods of Baire category, that the seemingly isolated examples of non-singular transformations first discovered by Ornstein and later by Chacón, were in fact the typical case.

Beginning in the early 1980s, Bellow began a series of papers that brought about a revival of that area of ergodic theory dealing with limit theorems and the delicate question of point-wise a.e. convergence. This was accomplished by exploiting the interplay with probability and harmonic analysis, in the modern context (the Central limit theorem, transference principles, square functions and other singular integral techniques are now part of the daily arsenal of people working in this area of ergodic theory) and by attracting a number of talented mathematicians who were very active in this area. One of the two problems that she raised at the Oberwolfach meeting on "Measure Theory" in 1981, was the question of the validity, for $f$ in $L_1$, of the point-wise ergodic theorem along the ‘sequence of squares’, and along the ‘sequence of primes’ (A similar question was raised independently, a year later, by Hillel Furstenberg). This problem was solved several years later by Jean Bourgain, for $f$ in $L_p$, $p>1$ in the case of the "squares", and for $p > (1+\sqrt{3})/2$ in the case of the "primes" (the argument was pushed through to $p>1$ by Máté Wierdl; the case of $L_1$ however has remained open). Bourgain was awarded the Fields Medal in 1994, in part for this work in ergodic theory.

It was Ulrich Krengel who first gave, in 1971, an ingenious construction of an increasing sequence of positive integers along which the point-wise ergodic theorem fails in $L_1$ for every ergodic transformation. The existence of such a "bad universal sequence" came as a surprise. Bellow showed that every lacunary sequence of integers is in fact a "bad universal sequence" in $L_1$. Thus lacunary sequences are ‘canonical’ examples of "bad universal sequences". Later she was able to show that from the point of view of the point-wise ergodic theorem, a sequence of positive integers may be "good universal" in $L_p$, but "bad universal" in $L_q$, for all $1\le q < p$. This was rather surprising and answered a question raised by Roger Jones.

A place in this area of research is occupied by the "strong sweeping out property" (that a sequence of linear operators may exhibit). This describes the situation when almost everywhere convergence breaks down even in $L_{\infty}$ and in the worst possible way. Instances of this appear in several of her papers. The "strong sweeping out property" plays an important role in this area of research. Bellow and her collaborators did an extensive and systematic study of this notion, giving various criteria and numerous examples of the strong sweeping out property. Working with Krengel, she was able to give a negative answer to a long-standing conjecture of Eberhard Hopf. Later, Bellow and Krengel working with Calderón were able to show that in fact the Hopf operators have the "strong sweeping out" property.

In the study of aperiodic flows, sampling at nearly periodic times, as for example, $t_n= n+\varepsilon (n)$, where $\varepsilon$ is positive and tends to zero, does not lead to a.e. convergence; in fact strong sweeping out occurs. This shows the possibility of serious errors when using the ergodic theorem for the study of physical systems. Such results can be of practical value for statisticians and other scientists. In the study of discrete ergodic systems, which can be observed only over certain blocks of time, one has the following dichotomy of behavior of the corresponding averages: either the averages converge a.e. for all functions in $L_1$, or the strong sweeping out property holds. This depends on the geometric properties of the blocks.

Several mathematicians (including Bourgain) worked on problems posed by Bellow and answered those questions in their papers.

== Academic honors, awards, recognition ==
- 1977–80 Member, Visiting Committee, Harvard University Mathematics Department
- 1980 Fairchild Distinguished Scholar Award, California Institute of Technology, Winter Term
- 1987 Humboldt Prize, Alexander von Humboldt Foundation, Bonn, Germany
- 1991 Emmy Noether Lecture, San Francisco
- 1997 International Conference in Honor of Alexandra Bellow, on the occasion of her retirement, held at Northwestern University, October 23–26, 1997. A Proceedings of this Conference appeared as a special issue of the Illinois Journal of Mathematics, Fall 1999, Vol. 43, No. 3.
- 2017 class of Fellows of the American Mathematical Society "for contributions to analysis, particularly ergodic theory and measure theory, and for exposition".

== Professional editorial activities ==
- 1974–77 Editor, Transactions of the American Mathematical Society
- 1980–82 Associate Editor, Annals of Probability
- 1979– Associate Editor, Advances in Mathematics

== See also ==
- Saul Bellow
