= George Maltese =

American mathematician

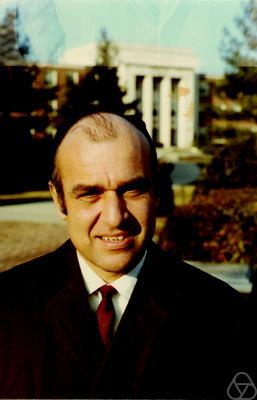
George Maltese

George John Maltese (June 24, 1931 in Middletown, Connecticut – October 23, 2009 in Middletown, Connecticut) was an American mathematician whose primary field of research was functional analysis.

== Life and career ==
Maltese was born in Middletown, Connecticut, to a family of Italian ancestry. Between 1949 and 1953 he studied at the Wesleyan University. There he obtained his first degree, a (Bachelor of Arts, B.A.) in mathematics. From 1953 to 1954 he continued his studies as a Fulbright Fellow at the Goethe-University Frankfurt (Germany). From 1956 to 1960 he studied at Yale University (New Haven, Connecticut). There he earned his PhD with the dissertation Generalized Convolution Algebras and Spectral Representations supervised by Cassius Ionescu-Tulcea. During 1960–61 he worked as a NATO Fellow at the Georg-August-University of Göttingen (Germany). After lecturing as an instructor at the MIT in Cambridge, Massachusetts he joined in 1963 the University of Maryland, College Park, (Maryland). There he worked, interrupted by guest professorships at the University of Frankfurt (in 1966–67 and 1970–71), until 1973, from 1969 on as a Full Professor.

In 1973 Maltese moved to Germany where he accepted a position as a Full Professor for mathematics at the University of Münster; there he worked until he retired in 1996. His research within the field of Functional analysis was concerned mainly with Harmonic analysis, the theory of Banach-algebras, integral representations in convex sets, and Korovkin theory.

Maltese served as a guest professor at several universities, including the University of Palermo in 1970–71, the University of Bari in 1979, the University of Kuwait in 1977, the University of Bahrain in 1988–89, and the University of Oman in 1990–91.

The Mathematics Genealogy Project lists 17 PhD students of Maltese, among others Ferdinand Beckhoff (Habilitation in 1994) and Anand Srivastav (Professor of Computer Science at the Christian-Albrechts-University of Kiel).

Since 1987 he was a member of the Academia nazionale di szienze, lettere e arti di Palermo. Following his retirement Maltese went, together with his wife Marlene (née Kunz) back to Middletown and the Wesleyan University.

== Selected papers ==
- Convex ideals and positive multiplicative forms in partially ordered algebras. Math. Scand. 9, 372–382 (1961).
- Spectral representations for solutions of certain abstract functional equations. Compos. Math. 15, 1–22 (1961).
- Spectral representations for some unbounded normal operators. Trans. Am. Math. Soc. 110, 79–87 (1964).
- mit R.S. Bucy: Extreme positive definite functions and Choquet’s representation theorem. J. Math. Anal. Appl. 12, 371–377 (1965).
- mit R.S. Bucy: A representation theorem for positive functionals on involution algebras. Math. Ann. 162, 364–367 (1966).
- Multiplicative extensions of multiplicative functionals in Banach algebras. Arch. Math. 21, 502–505 (1970).
- On Bauer’s characterization of extreme points. Math. Ann. 184, 326–328 (1970).
- Extensions of pure states in normed spaces. Rend. Circ. Mat. Palermo, II. Ser. 25, 83–88 (1976).
- Convexity methods and the Choquet boundary in Banach algebras. Boll. Unione Mat. Ital., V. Ser., A 15, 131–136 (1978).
- Integral representation theorems via Banach algebras. Enseign. Math., II. Sér. 25, 273–284 (1979).
- A remark on the existence of nonannihilating vectors and functionals in normed spaces. Boll. Unione Mat. Ital., V. Ser., A 17, 128–130 (1980).
- Prime ideals are dense in maximal ideals of continuous functions. Rend. Circ. Mat. Palermo, II. Ser. 30, 50–52 (1981).
- Extreme points of intervals in C * -algebras. Arch. Math. 45, 354–358 (1985).
- A simple proof of the fundamental theorem of finite Markov chains. Am. Math. Mon. 93, 629–630 (1986).
- mit Gerd Niestegge: A linear Radon–Nikodým type theorem for C * -algebras with applications to measure theory. Ann. Sc. Norm. Super. Pisa, Cl. Sci., IV. Ser. 14, No.2, 345–354
- mit Regina Wille-Fier: A characterization of homomorphisms in certain Banach involution algebras. Stud. Math. 89, No.2, 133–143 (1988).
- Extreme positive functionals and ideals of finite codimension in commutative Banach * -algebras. Atti Semin. Mat. Fis. Univ. Modena 39, No.2, 569–580 (1991).
- A representation theorem for positive functionals on involution algebras (revisited). Boll. Unione Mat. Ital., VII. Ser., A 8, No.3, 431–438 (1994).
- Some remarks on the Riesz representation theorem in Hilbert space. Boll. Unione Mat. Ital., VII. Ser., B 11, No.4, 903–907 (1997).
- The role of convexity in existence theorems for invariant and hyperinvariant subspaces in Hilbert spaces. Rend. Circ. Mat. Palermo, II. Ser. 49, No.2, 381–390 (2000).
