= Cassius Ionescu-Tulcea =

Romanian-American mathematician (1923–2021)

Cassius Tocqueville Ionescu Tulcea (Romanian: Casius Ionescu-Tulcea; October 14, 1923 – March 6, 2021) was a Romanian-American mathematician, specializing in probability theory, statistics and mathematical analysis.

== Life and career ==
Ionescu Tulcea was born in October 1923 in Bucharest. He received his diploma from the University of Bucharest in 1946; there he was an assistant professor from 1946 to 1950, a lecturer from 1950 to 1951, and an associate professor from 1952 to 1957. Additionally, from 1949 to 1957 he was a researcher at the Institute of Mathematics of the Romanian Academy. In 1957 he moved to the United States with his wife Alexandra Ionescu Tulcea (née Bagdasar), who had been his student. From 1957 to 1961 he worked as a research associate and visiting lecturer at Yale University. He received his doctorate from Yale in 1959 under the supervision of Einar Hille with thesis Semi-groups of Operators. Cassius Ionescu Tulcea was from 1959 to 1961 a visiting professor at Yale University, from 1961 to 1964 an associate professor at the University of Pennsylvania, and from 1964 to 1966 a full professor at the University of Illinois at Urbana–Champaign. He became in 1966 a full professor at Northwestern University and retired from there as professor emeritus.

His marriage to his former student Alexandra Bagdasar lasted from 1956 to 1969 when they divorced. During their marriage, the two mathematicians wrote a number of papers together, as well as a well-regarded research monograph on lifting theory. John von Neumann initiated lifting theory in functional analysis with applications in probability theory. The Ionescu-Tulcea theorem, an important existence theorem for time-discrete stochastic processes, is named after Cassius Ionescu Tulcea (1949). He also did research on mathematical game theory and mathematical economics. He co-authored a book on casino gambling and several textbooks on mathematics; he also wrote a 1981 book on casino dice games and gambling systems and a 1982 book on casino blackjack.

In 1957 he was awarded the Prize of the Romanian Academy of Sciences. His doctoral students include George Maltese and Robert Langlands.

He turned 90 in October 2013 and died in Chicago, Illinois, in March 2021, at the age of 97.

== Selected publications ==
- A book on casino blackjack, Van Nostrand 1982
- with Virginia L. Graham: A book on casino gambling: written by a mathematician and a computer expert, 1976, 2nd edition, Van Nostrand 1978
- A book on casino craps, other dice games & gambling systems, Van Nostrand 1981
- with Robert G. Bartle: Calculus, Scott Foresman 1968
- with Robert G. Bartle: An introduction to Calculus, Scott Foresman 1968
- with Robert G. Bartle: Honors Calculus, Scott Foresman 1970
- with William W. Fairchild: Topology, Philadelphia: Saunders 1971
- with William W. Fairchild: Sets, Saunders 1970
- with Alexandra Ionescu Tulcea: Topics in the Theory of Lifting, Ergebnisse der Mathematik und ihrer Grenzgebiete, Band 48, Springer-Verlag New York Inc., New York 1969, doi:10.1007/978-3-642-88507-5, MR 0276438.
