= Extended negative binomial distribution =

Probability distribution

In probability and statistics the extended negative binomial distribution is a discrete probability distribution extending the negative binomial distribution. It is a truncated version of the negative binomial distribution for which estimation methods have been studied.

In the context of actuarial science, the distribution appeared in its general form in a paper by K. Hess, A. Liewald and K.D. Schmidt when they characterized all distributions for which the extended Panjer recursion works. For the case m = 1, the distribution was already discussed by Willmot and put into a parametrized family with the logarithmic distribution and the negative binomial distribution by H.U. Gerber.

== Probability mass function ==
For a natural number m ≥ 1 and real parameters p, r with 0 < p ≤ 1 and –m < r < –m + 1, the probability mass function of the ExtNegBin(m, r, p) distribution is given by

$$f(k;m,r,p)=0\qquad \text{ for }k\in\{0,1,\ldots,m-1\}$$

and

$$f(k;m,r,p) = \frac{{k+r-1 \choose k} p^k}{(1-p)^{-r}-\sum_{j=0}^{m-1}{j+r-1 \choose j} p^j}\quad\text{for }k\in{\mathbb N}\text{ with }k\ge m,$$

where

$${k+r-1 \choose k} = \frac{\Gamma(k+r)}{k!\,\Gamma(r)} = (-1)^k\,{-r \choose k}\qquad\qquad(1)$$

is the (generalized) binomial coefficient and Γ denotes the gamma function.

== Probability generating function ==
Using that f ( . ; m, r, ps) for s ∈ (0, 1] is also a probability mass function, it follows that the probability generating function is given by

$$\begin{align}\varphi(s)&=\sum_{k=m}^\infty f(k;m,r,p)s^k\\
&=\frac{(1-ps)^{-r}-\sum_{j=0}^{m-1}\binom{j+r-1}j (ps)^j}
{(1-p)^{-r}-\sum_{j=0}^{m-1}\binom{j+r-1}j p^j}
\qquad\text{for } |s|\le\frac1p.\end{align}$$

For the important case m = 1, hence r ∈ (–1, 0), this simplifies to

$$\varphi(s)=\frac{1-(1-ps)^{-r}}{1-(1-p)^{-r}}
\qquad\text{for }|s|\le\frac1p.$$
