= Geometric Poisson distribution =

In probability theory and statistics, the geometric Poisson distribution (also called the Pólya–Aeppli distribution) is used for describing objects that come in clusters, where the number of clusters follows a Poisson distribution and the number of objects within a cluster follows a geometric distribution. It is a particular case of the compound Poisson distribution.

The probability mass function of a random variable N distributed according to the geometric Poisson distribution $\mathcal{PG}(\lambda,\theta)$ is given by

$$f_N(n) = \mathrm{Pr}(N=n)= \begin{cases} \sum_{k=1}^n e^{-\lambda}\frac{\lambda^k}{k!}(1-\theta)^{n-k}\theta^k\binom{n-1}{k-1}, & n>0 \\ e^{-\lambda}, & n=0 \end{cases}$$

where λ is the parameter of the underlying Poisson distribution and θ is the parameter of the geometric distribution.

The distribution was described by George Pólya in 1930. Pólya credited his student Alfred Aeppli's 1924 dissertation as the original source. It was called the geometric Poisson distribution by Sherbrooke in 1968, who gave probability tables with a precision of four decimal places.

The geometric Poisson distribution has been used to describe systems modelled by a Markov model, such as biological processes or traffic accidents.

== See also ==
- Poisson distribution
- Compound Poisson distribution
- Geometric distribution

== Bibliography ==
- Johnson, N.L.; Kotz, S.; Kemp, A.W. (2005). Univariate Discrete Distributions (3rd ed.). New York: Wiley.
- Nuel, Grégory (March 2008). "Cumulative distribution function of a geometric Poisson distribution". Journal of Statistical Computation and Simulation. 78 (3): 385–394. doi:10.1080/10629360600997371. S2CID 120459738.
- Özel, Gamze; İnal, Ceyhan (May 2010). "The probability function of a geometric Poisson distribution". Journal of Statistical Computation and Simulation. 80 (5): 479–487. doi:10.1080/00949650802711925. S2CID 122546267.
