= Logarithmic =

Logarithmic can refer to:

- Logarithm, a transcendental function in mathematics
- Logarithmic scale, the use of the logarithmic function to describe measurements
- Logarithmic spiral,
- Logarithmic growth
- Logarithmic distribution, a discrete probability distribution
- Natural logarithm
