= Logarithmic distribution =

Discrete probability distribution

Logarithmic
- Probability mass function Plot of the logarithmic PMF The function is only defined at integer values. The connecting lines are merely guides for the eye.

- Cumulative distribution function Plot of the logarithmic CDF
- Parameters: $0 < p < 1$
- Support: $k \in \{1,2,3,\ldots\}$
- PMF: $\frac{-1}{\ln(1-p)} \frac{p^k}{k}$
- CDF: $1 + \frac{\Beta(p;k+1,0)}{\ln(1-p)}$
- Mean: $\frac{-1}{\ln(1-p)} \frac{p}{1-p}$
- Mode: $1$
- Variance: $- \frac{p^2 + p\ln(1-p)}{(1-p)^2(\ln(1-p))^2}$
- MGF: $\frac{\ln(1 - pe^t)}{\ln(1-p)}\text{ for }t < -\ln p$
- CF: $\frac{\ln(1 - pe^{it})}{\ln(1-p)}$
- PGF: $\frac{\ln(1-pz)}{\ln(1-p)}\text{ for }|z| < \frac{1}{p}$

In probability and statistics, the logarithmic distribution (also known as the logarithmic series distribution or the log-series distribution) is a discrete probability distribution derived from the Maclaurin series expansion

$$-\ln(1-p)  = p + \frac{p^2}{2} + \frac{p^3}{3} + \cdots.$$

From this we obtain the identity

$$\sum_{k=1}^{\infty} \frac{-1}{\ln(1-p)} \; \frac{p^k}{k} = 1.$$

This leads directly to the probability mass function of a Log(p)-distributed random variable:

$$f(k) = \frac{-1}{\ln(1-p)} \; \frac{p^k}{k}$$

for k ≥ 1, and where 0 < p < 1. Because of the identity above, the distribution is properly normalized.

The cumulative distribution function is

$$F(k) = 1 + \frac{\Beta(p; k+1,0)}{\ln(1-p)}$$

where B is the incomplete beta function.

A Poisson compounded with Log(p)-distributed random variables has a negative binomial distribution. In other words, if N is a random variable with a Poisson distribution, and X_{i}, i = 1, 2, 3, ... is an infinite sequence of independent identically distributed random variables each having a Log(p) distribution, then

$$\sum_{i=1}^N X_i$$

has a negative binomial distribution. In this way, the negative binomial distribution is seen to be a compound Poisson distribution.

R. A. Fisher described the logarithmic distribution in a paper that used it to model relative species abundance.

== See also ==
- Poisson distribution (also derived from a Maclaurin series)
