= Factorial moment generating function =

In probability theory and statistics, the factorial moment generating function (FMGF) of the probability distribution of a real-valued random variable X is defined as

$$M_X(t)=\operatorname{E}\bigl[t^{X}\bigr]$$

for all complex numbers t for which this expected value exists. This is the case at least for all t on the unit circle $|t|=1$, see characteristic function. If X is a discrete random variable taking values only in the set {0,1, ...} of non-negative integers, then $M_X$ is also called probability-generating function (PGF) of X and $M_X(t)$ is well-defined at least for all t on the closed unit disk $|t|\le1$.

The factorial moment generating function generates the factorial moments of the probability distribution. Provided $M_X$ exists in a neighbourhood of t = 1, the nth factorial moment is given by

$$\operatorname{E}[(X)_n]=M_X^{(n)}(1)=\left.\frac{\mathrm{d}^n}{\mathrm{d}t^n}\right|_{t=1} M_X(t),$$

where the Pochhammer symbol (x)_{n} is the falling factorial

$$(x)_n = x(x-1)(x-2)\cdots(x-n+1).\,$$

(Many mathematicians, especially in the field of special functions, use the same notation to represent the rising factorial.)

== Examples ==
=== Poisson distribution ===
Suppose X has a Poisson distribution with expected value λ, then its factorial moment generating function is

$$M_X(t)
=\sum_{k=0}^\infty t^k\underbrace{\operatorname{P}(X=k)}_{=\,\lambda^ke^{-\lambda}/k!}
=e^{-\lambda}\sum_{k=0}^\infty \frac{(t\lambda)^k}{k!} = e^{\lambda(t-1)},\qquad t\in\mathbb{C},$$

(use the definition of the exponential function) and thus we have

$$\operatorname{E}[(X)_n]=\lambda^n.$$

== See also ==
- Moment (mathematics)
- Moment-generating function
- Cumulant-generating function
