= Compound Poisson process =

Random process in probability theory

A compound Poisson process is a continuous-time stochastic process with jumps. The jumps arrive randomly according to a Poisson process and the size of the jumps is also random, with a specified probability distribution. To be precise, a compound Poisson process, parameterised by a rate $\lambda > 0$ and jump size distribution G, is a process $\{\,Y(t) : t \geq 0 \,\}$ given by

$$Y(t) = \sum_{i=1}^{N(t)} D_i$$

where, $\{\,N(t) : t \geq 0\,\}$ is the counting variable of a Poisson process with rate $\lambda$, and $\{\,D_i : i \geq 1\,\}$ are independent and identically distributed random variables, with distribution function G, which are also independent of $\{\,N(t) : t \geq 0\,\}.\,$

When $D_i$ are non-negative integer-valued random variables, then this compound Poisson process is known as a stuttering Poisson process.

== Properties of the compound Poisson process ==
The expected value of a compound Poisson process can be calculated using a result known as Wald's equation as:

$$\operatorname E(Y(t)) = \operatorname E(D_1 + \cdots + D_{N(t)}) = \operatorname  E(N(t))\operatorname E(D_1) = \operatorname  E(N(t)) \operatorname E(D) = \lambda t \operatorname  E(D).$$

Making similar use of the law of total variance, the variance can be calculated as:

$$\begin{align}
\operatorname{var}(Y(t)) &= \operatorname  E(\operatorname{var}(Y(t)\mid N(t))) + \operatorname{var}(\operatorname E(Y(t)\mid N(t))) \\[5pt]
&= \operatorname E(N(t)\operatorname{var}(D)) + \operatorname{var}(N(t) \operatorname E(D)) \\[5pt]
&= \operatorname{var}(D) \operatorname E(N(t)) + \operatorname E(D)^2 \operatorname{var}(N(t)) \\[5pt]
&= \operatorname{var}(D)\lambda t + \operatorname E(D)^2\lambda t \\[5pt]
&= \lambda t(\operatorname{var}(D) + \operatorname E(D)^2) \\[5pt]
&= \lambda t \operatorname E(D^2).
\end{align}$$

Lastly, using the law of total probability, the moment generating function can be given as follows:

$$\Pr(Y(t)=i) = \sum_n \Pr(Y(t)=i\mid N(t)=n)\Pr(N(t)=n)$$

$$\begin{align}
\operatorname E(e^{sY}) & = \sum_i e^{si} \Pr(Y(t)=i) \\[5pt]
& = \sum_i e^{si} \sum_{n} \Pr(Y(t)=i\mid N(t)=n)\Pr(N(t)=n) \\[5pt]
& = \sum_n \Pr(N(t)=n) \sum_i e^{si} \Pr(Y(t)=i\mid N(t)=n) \\[5pt]
& = \sum_n \Pr(N(t)=n) \sum_i e^{si}\Pr(D_1 + D_2 + \cdots + D_n=i) \\[5pt]
& = \sum_n \Pr(N(t)=n) M_D(s)^n \\[5pt]
& = \sum_n \Pr(N(t)=n) e^{n\ln(M_D(s))} \\[5pt]
& = M_{N(t)}(\ln(M_D(s))) \\[5pt]
& = e^{\lambda t \left( M_D(s) - 1 \right) }.
\end{align}$$

== Exponentiation of measures ==
Let N, Y, and D be as above. Let μ be the probability measure according to which D is distributed, i.e.

$$\mu(A) = \Pr(D \in A).\,$$

Let δ_{0} be the trivial probability distribution putting all of the mass at zero. Then the probability distribution of Y(t) is the measure

$$\exp(\lambda t(\mu - \delta_0))\,$$

where the exponential exp(ν) of a finite measure ν on Borel subsets of the real line is defined by

$$\exp(\nu) = \sum_{n=0}^\infty {\nu^{*n} \over n!}$$

and

$$\nu^{*n} = \underbrace{\nu * \cdots *\nu}_{n \text{ factors}}$$

is a convolution of measures, and the series converges weakly.

== See also ==
- Poisson process
- Poisson distribution
- Compound Poisson distribution
- Non-homogeneous Poisson process
- Campbell's formula for the moment generating function of a compound Poisson process
