= Adrienne W. Kemp =

British statistician (1930–2022)

Adrienne Winifred "Freda" Kemp (1930–2022) was a British mathematical statistician known for her work on discrete probability distributions including the Hermite distribution.

== Life ==
Kemp received a bachelor's degree in mathematics with economics at the University of Bristol in 1951. Next, she studied statistics and biology at the University of Oxford, receiving a diploma in statistics and a degree in biology in 1953. At Oxford, she met David Kemp in the same course; they married in 1952. She became an assistant statistician at the Grassland Research Station in Hurley, Berkshire until 1956, when she left work to start a family, eventually comprising four children. Her work at the station began her interest in discrete distributions, applied to plant species.

In 1953, Kemp and her family moved to Belfast, and the following year she began a doctoral program at Queen's University Belfast, which she completed in 1968, continuing afterwards at Belfast as an honorary research fellow. Her doctoral dissertation was Studies in Univariate Discrete Distribution Theory Based on the Generalized Hypergeometric Function and Associated Differential Equations.

The family moved again in 1970 to Ilkley and the University of Bradford, where her husband became a professor of statistics and she became an honorary fellow. In 1974 she became a lecturer. She and her husband retired in 1983, and moved to St Andrews, Scotland, where she took an honorary research position in the School of Mathematics and Statistics at the University of St Andrews. In her retirement, she continued publishing and editing as an academic statistician. It was in this time that she joined the authors of the textbook Univariate Discrete Distributions in a 1992 second edition, in which the newly added text, equal in length to the entire first edition, was "substantially hers".

She died of a long illness on 6 March 2022.

== Recognition ==
In 2024, the "Workshop on Discrete Distributions In Memory of Adrienne Freda Kemp" was held at Harokopio University in Athens.

== Selected works ==
=== Textbook ===
- Johnson, Norman L.; Kotz, Samuel; Kemp, Adrienne W. (1992), Univariate Discrete Distributions, Wiley Series in Probability and Mathematical Statistics: Applied Probability and Statistics (2nd ed.), New York: John Wiley & Sons, Inc., ISBN 0-471-54897-9, MR 1224449; 3rd ed., 2005, ISBN 978-0-471-27246-5, MR 2163227

=== Research articles ===
- Kemp, C. D.; Kemp, Adrienne W. (1965), "Some properties of the 'Hermite' distribution", Biometrika, 52 (3–4): 381–394, doi:10.1093/biomet/52.3-4.381, MR 0208717
- Kemp, Adrienne W. (1997), "Characterizations of a discrete normal distribution", Journal of Statistical Planning and Inference, 63 (2): 223–229, doi:10.1016/S0378-3758(97)00020-7, MR 1491581
- Kemp, Adrienne W. (2004), "Classes of discrete lifetime distributions", Communications in Statistics, 33 (11–12): 3069–3093, doi:10.1081/STA-200039051, MR 2138674
