= Moment generating function =

Concept in probability theory and statistics

In probability theory and statistics, the moment generating function of a real-valued random variable is a generating function that provides an alternative specification of the random variable's probability distribution. Thus, it provides the basis of an alternative route to analytical results compared with working directly with probability density functions or cumulative distribution functions. There are particularly simple results for the moment generating functions of distributions defined by the weighted sums of random variables. However, not all random variables have moment generating functions.

As its name implies, the moment generating function can be used to compute a distribution’s moments: the n-th moment about 0 is the n-th derivative of the moment generating function, evaluated at 0.

In addition to univariate real-valued distributions, moment generating functions can also be defined for vector- or matrix-valued random variables, and can even be extended to more general cases.

The moment generating function of a real-valued distribution does not always exist, unlike the characteristic function. There are relations between the behavior of the moment generating function of a distribution and properties of the distribution, such as the existence of moments.

== Definition ==
Let $X$ be a random variable with CDF $F_X$. The moment generating function (mgf) of $X$ (or $F_X$), denoted by $M_X(t)$, is

$$M_X(t) = \operatorname E \left[e^{tX}\right]$$

provided this expectation exists for $t$ in some open neighborhood of 0. That is, there is an $h > 0$ such that for all $t$ satisfying $-h < t < h$, $\operatorname E \left[e^{tX}\right]$ exists. If the expectation does not exist in an open neighborhood of 0, we say that the moment generating function does not exist.

In other words, the moment generating function of X is the expectation of the random variable $e^{tX}$. More generally, when $\mathbf X = ( X_1, \ldots, X_n)^{\mathrm{T}}$, an $n$-dimensional random vector, and $\mathbf t$ is a fixed vector, one uses $\mathbf t \cdot \mathbf X = \mathbf t^\mathrm T\mathbf X$ instead of $tX$:
$$M_{\mathbf X}(\mathbf t) := \operatorname E \left[e^{\mathbf t^\mathrm T\mathbf X}\right].$$

$M_X(0)$ always exists and is equal to 1. However, a key problem with moment generating functions is that moments and the moment generating function may not exist, as the integrals need not converge absolutely. By contrast, the characteristic function or Fourier transform always exists (because it is the integral of a bounded function on a space of finite measure), and for some purposes may be used instead.

The moment generating function is so named because it can be used to find the moments of the distribution. The series expansion of $e^{tX}$ is

$$e^{t X} = 1 + t X + \frac{t^2 X^2}{2!} + \frac{t^3 X^3}{3!} + \cdots + \frac{t^n X^n}{n!} + \cdots.$$

Hence,
$$\begin{align}
M_X(t) &= \operatorname E [e^{t X}] \\[1ex]
&= 1 + t \operatorname E[X] + \frac{t^2 \operatorname E[X^2]}{2!} + \frac{t^3 \operatorname E[X^3]}{3!} + \cdots + \frac{t^n\operatorname E [X^n]}{n!}+\cdots \\[1ex]
& = 1 + t m_1 + \frac{t^2 m_2}{2!} + \frac{t^3 m_3}{3!} + \cdots + \frac{t^n m_n}{n!} + \cdots,
\end{align}$$

where $m_n$ is the $n$-th moment. Differentiating $M_X(t)$ $i$ times with respect to $t$ and setting $t = 0$, we obtain the $i$-th moment about the origin, $m_i$.

If $X$ is a continuous random variable, the following relation between its moment generating function $M_X(t)$ and the two-sided Laplace transform of its probability density function $f_X(x)$ holds:

$$M_X(t) = \mathcal{L}\{f_X\}(-t),$$

since the PDF's two-sided Laplace transform is given as

$$\mathcal{L}\{f_X\}(s) = \int_{-\infty}^\infty e^{-sx} f_X(x)\, dx,$$

and the moment generating function's definition expands (by the law of the unconscious statistician) to
$$M_X(t) = \operatorname E \left[e^{tX}\right] = \int_{-\infty}^\infty e^{tx} f_X(x)\, dx.$$

This is consistent with the characteristic function of $X$ being a Wick rotation of $M_X(t)$ when the moment generating function exists, as the characteristic function of a continuous random variable $X$ is the Fourier transform of its probability density function $f_X(x)$, and in general when a function $f(x)$ is of exponential order, the Fourier transform of $f$ is a Wick rotation of its two-sided Laplace transform in the region of convergence. See the relation of the Fourier and Laplace transforms for further information.

== Examples ==
Here are some examples of the moment generating function and the characteristic function for comparison. It can be seen that the characteristic function is a Wick rotation of the moment generating function $M_X(t)$ when the latter exists.

Distribution	moment generating function $M_X(t)$	Characteristic function $\varphi (t)$
Degenerate $\delta_a$	$e^{ta}$	$e^{ita}$
Bernoulli $P(X = 1) = p$	$1 - p + pe^t$	$1 - p + pe^{it}$
Binomial $B(n, p)$	$\left(1 - p + pe^t\right)^n$	$\left(1 - p + pe^{it}\right)^n$
Geometric $(1 - p)^{k}\,p$	$\frac{p}{1 - (1 - p) e^t}, ~ t < -\ln(1 - p)$	$\frac{p}{1 - (1 - p)\,e^{it}}$
Negative binomial $\operatorname{NB}(r, p)$	$\left(\frac{p}{1 - e^t + pe^t}\right)^r, ~ t<-\ln(1-p)$	$\left(\frac{p}{1 - e^{it} + pe^{it}}\right)^r$
Poisson $\operatorname{Pois}(\lambda)$	$e^{\lambda(e^t - 1)}$	$e^{\lambda(e^{it} - 1)}$
Uniform (continuous) $\operatorname U(a, b)$	$\frac{e^{tb} - e^{ta}}{t(b - a)}$	$\frac{e^{itb} - e^{ita}}{it(b - a)}$
Uniform (discrete) $\operatorname{DU}(a, b)$	$\frac{e^{at} - e^{(b + 1)t}}{(b - a + 1)(1 - e^t)}$	$\frac{e^{ait} - e^{(b + 1)it}}{(b - a + 1)(1 - e^{it})}$
Laplace $L(\mu, b)$	$\frac{e^{t\mu}}{1 - b^2t^2}, ~ |t| < 1/b$	$\frac{e^{it\mu}}{1 + b^2t^2}$
Normal $N(\mu, \sigma^2)$	$e^{t\mu + \sigma^2 t^2 / 2}$	$e^{it\mu - \sigma^2 t^2 / 2}$
Chi-squared $\chi^2_k$	${\left(1 - 2t\right)}^{-k/2}, ~ t < 1/2$	${\left(1 - 2it\right)}^{-{k}/{2}}$
Noncentral chi-squared $\chi^2_k(\lambda)$	$e^{\lambda t/(1-2t)} {\left(1 - 2t\right)}^{-k/2}$	$e^{i\lambda t/(1-2it)} {\left(1 - 2it\right)}^{-k/2}$
Gamma $\Gamma(k, \tfrac{1}{\theta})$	${\left(1 - t\theta\right)}^{-k}, ~ t < \tfrac{1}{\theta}$	${\left(1 - it\theta\right)}^{-k}$
Exponential $\operatorname{Exp}(\lambda)$	$\left(1 - t\lambda^{-1}\right)^{-1}, ~ t < \lambda$	$\left(1 - it\lambda^{-1}\right)^{-1}$
Beta	$1 +\sum_{k=1}^{\infty} \left( \prod_{r=0}^{k-1} \frac{\alpha+r}{\alpha+\beta+r} \right) \frac{t^k}{k!}$	${}_1F_1(\alpha; \alpha+\beta; i\,t)\!$ (see Confluent hypergeometric function)
Multivariate normal $N(\mathbf{\mu}, \mathbf{\Sigma})$	$\exp\left[\mathbf{t}^\mathrm{T} \left( \boldsymbol{\mu} + \tfrac{1}{2} \boldsymbol{\Sigma} \mathbf{t}\right)\right]$	$\exp\left[\mathbf{t}^\mathrm{T} \left(i \boldsymbol{\mu} - \tfrac{1}{2} \boldsymbol{\Sigma} \mathbf{t}\right)\right]$
Cauchy $\operatorname{Cauchy}(\mu, \theta)$	Does not exist	$e^{it\mu - \theta|t|}$
Multivariate Cauchy $\operatorname{MultiCauchy}(\mu, \Sigma)$	Does not exist	$\exp\left(i\mathbf{t}^{\mathrm{T}}\boldsymbol\mu - \sqrt{\mathbf{t}^{\mathrm{T}}\boldsymbol{\Sigma} \mathbf{t}}\right)$

== Calculation ==
The moment generating function is the expectation of a function of the random variable, it can be written as:

- For a discrete probability mass function, $M_X(t)=\sum_{i=0}^\infty e^{tx_i}\, p_i$
- For a continuous probability density function, $M_X(t) = \int_{-\infty}^\infty e^{tx} f(x)\,dx$
- In the general case: $M_X(t) = \int_{-\infty}^\infty e^{tx}\,dF(x)$, using the Riemann–Stieltjes integral, and where $F$ is the cumulative distribution function. This is simply the Laplace-Stieltjes transform of $F$, but with the sign of the argument reversed.

Note that for the case where $X$ has a continuous probability density function $f(x)$, $M_X(-t)$ is the two-sided Laplace transform of $f(x)$.

$$\begin{align}
M_X(t) & = \int_{-\infty}^\infty e^{tx} f(x)\,dx \\[1ex]
& = \int_{-\infty}^\infty \left( 1+ tx + \frac{t^2 x^2}{2!} + \cdots + \frac{t^n x^n}{n!} + \cdots\right) f(x)\,dx \\[1ex]
& = 1 + tm_1 + \frac{t^2 m_2}{2!} + \cdots + \frac{t^n m_n}{n!} +\cdots,
\end{align}$$

where $m_n$ is the $n$th moment.

=== Linear transformations of random variables ===
If random variable $X$ has moment generating function $M_X(t)$, then $\alpha X + \beta$ has moment generating function $M_{\alpha X + \beta}(t) = e^{\beta t}M_X(\alpha t)$

$$M_{\alpha X + \beta}(t) = \operatorname{E}\left[e^{(\alpha X + \beta) t}\right] = e^{\beta t} \operatorname{E}\left[e^{\alpha Xt}\right] = e^{\beta t} M_X(\alpha t)$$

=== Linear combination of independent random variables ===
If $S_n = \sum_{i=1}^n a_i X_i$, where the X_{i} are independent random variables and the a_{i} are constants, then the probability density function for S_{n} is the convolution of the probability density functions of each of the X_{i}, and the moment generating function for S_{n} is given by

$$M_{S_n}(t) = M_{X_1}(a_1t) M_{X_2}(a_2t) \cdots M_{X_n}(a_nt) \, .$$

=== Vector-valued random variables ===
For vector-valued random variables $\mathbf X$ with real components, the moment generating function is given by

$$M_X(\mathbf t) = \operatorname{E}\left[e^{\langle \mathbf t, \mathbf X \rangle}\right]$$

where $\mathbf t$ is a vector and $\langle \cdot, \cdot \rangle$ is the dot product.

== Important properties ==
Moment generating functions are positive and log-convex, with M(0) = 1.

An important property of the moment generating function is that it uniquely determines the distribution. In other words, if $X$ and $Y$ are two random variables and for all values of t,

$$M_X(t) = M_Y(t),$$
then
$$F_X(x) = F_Y(x)$$

for all values of x (or equivalently X and Y have the same distribution). This statement is not equivalent to the statement "if two distributions have the same moments, then they are identical at all points." This is because in some cases, the moments exist and yet the moment generating function does not, because the limit

$$\lim_{n \to \infty} \sum_{i=0}^n \frac{t^i m_i}{i!}$$

may not exist. The log-normal distribution is an example of when this occurs: its moments are $\operatorname{E}[X^n] = e^{n\mu+n^2\sigma^2/2}$ and are all finite but its moment generating function $\operatorname E \left[e^{tX}\right]$ is not defined for any positive t as the integral diverges and so not in a neighbourhood of 0; there are other distributions with the same moments.

=== Calculations of moments ===
The moment generating function is so called because if it exists on an open interval around t = 0, then it is the exponential generating function of the moments of the probability distribution:

$$m_n = \operatorname{E}\left[ X^n \right] = M_X^{(n)}(0) = \left. \frac{d^n M_X}{dt^n}\right|_{t=0}.$$

That is, with n being a nonnegative integer, the n-th moment about 0 is the n-th derivative of the moment generating function, evaluated at t = 0.

== Other properties ==
Jensen's inequality provides a simple lower bound on the moment generating function:
$$M_X(t) \geq e^{\mu t},$$
where $\mu$ is the mean of X.

The moment generating function can be used in conjunction with Markov's inequality to bound the upper tail of a real random variable X. This statement is also called the Chernoff bound. Since $x \mapsto e^{xt}$ is monotonically increasing for $t>0$, we have
$$\Pr(X \ge a) = \Pr(e^{tX} \ge e^{ta}) \le e^{-at} \operatorname{E}\left[e^{tX}\right] = e^{-at}M_X(t)$$
for any $t>0$ and any a, provided $M_X(t)$ exists. For example, when X is a standard normal distribution and $a > 0$, we can choose $t=a$ and recall that $M_X(t)=e^{t^2/2}$. This gives $\Pr(X\ge a)\le e^{-a^2/2}$, which is within a factor of 1+a of the exact value.

Various lemmas, such as Hoeffding's lemma or Bennett's inequality provide bounds on the moment generating function in the case of a zero-mean, bounded random variable.

When $X$ is non-negative, the moment generating function gives a simple, useful bound on the moments:
$$\operatorname{E}[X^m] \le \left(\frac{m}{te}\right)^m M_X(t),$$
For any $X,m\ge 0$ and $t>0$.

This follows from the inequality $1+x\le e^x$ into which we can substitute $x'=tx/m-1$ implies $tx/m\le e^{tx/m-1}$ for any $x, t, m \in \mathbb R$. Now, if $t > 0$ and $x,m\ge 0$, this can be rearranged to $x^m \le (m/(te))^m e^{tx}$. Taking the expectation on both sides gives the bound on $\operatorname{E}[X^m]$ in terms of $\operatorname{E}[e^{tX}]$.

As an example, consider $X\sim\text{Chi-Squared}$ with $k$ degrees of freedom. Then from the examples $M_X(t) = (1-2t)^{-k/2}$. Picking $t=m/(2m+k)$ and substituting into the bound:
$$\operatorname{E}[X^m] \le {\left(1 + 2m/k\right)}^{k/2} e^{-m} {\left(k + 2m\right)}^m.$$
We know that in this case the correct bound is $\operatorname{E}[X^m]\le 2^m \Gamma(m+k/2)/\Gamma(k/2)$. To compare the bounds, we can consider the asymptotics for large $k$. Here the moment generating function bound is $k^m(1+m^2/k + O(1/k^2))$, where the real bound is $k^m(1+(m^2-m)/k + O(1/k^2))$. The moment generating function bound is thus very strong in this case.

== Relation to other functions ==
Related to the moment generating function are a number of other transforms that are common in probability theory:

Characteristic function
The characteristic function $\varphi_X(t)$ is related to the moment generating function via $\varphi_X(t) = M_{iX}(t) = M_X(it):$ the characteristic function is the moment generating function of iX or the moment generating function of X evaluated on the imaginary axis. This function can also be viewed as the Fourier transform of the probability density function, which can therefore be deduced from it by inverse Fourier transform.
Cumulant-generating function
The cumulant-generating function is defined as the logarithm of the moment generating function; some instead define the cumulant-generating function as the logarithm of the characteristic function, while others call this latter the second cumulant-generating function.
Probability-generating function
The probability-generating function is defined as $G(z) = \operatorname{E}\left[z^X\right].$ This immediately implies that $G(e^t) = \operatorname{E}\left[e^{tX}\right] = M_X(t).$

== See also ==
- Characteristic function (probability theory)
- Factorial moment generating function
- Rate function
- Hamburger moment problem
