= Probability mass function =

Discrete-variable probability distribution

The graph of a PMF. All the values of this function must be non-negative and sum up to 1.

In probability and statistics, a probability mass function (PMF), discrete probability density function, probability function, or frequency function is a function that gives the probability that a discrete random variable is exactly equal to some value. The PMF is often the primary means of defining a discrete probability distribution, and such functions exist for either scalar or multivariate random variables whose domain is discrete.

A PMF differs from a continuous probability density function (PDF) in that the latter is associated with continuous rather than discrete random variables. A continuous PDF must be integrated over an interval to yield a probability.

The value of the random variable having the largest probability mass is called the mode.

== Formal definition ==
A PMF is the probability distribution of a discrete random variable, and provides the possible values and their associated probabilities. It is the function $p: \R \to [0,1]$ defined by

$p_X(x) = P(X = x)$

for $-\infin < x < \infin$, where $P$ is a probability measure. $p_X(x)$ can also be simplified as $p(x)$.

The probabilities associated with all (hypothetical) values must be non-negative and sum up to 1,

$$\sum_x p_X(x) = 1$$
and
$$p_X(x)\geq 0.$$

Thinking of probability as mass helps to avoid mistakes since the physical mass is conserved as is the total probability for all hypothetical outcomes $x$.

== Measure theoretic formulation ==
A PMF of a discrete random variable $X$ can be seen as a special case of two more general measure theoretic constructions: the distribution of $X$ and the probability density function of $X$ with respect to the counting measure. We make this more precise below.

Suppose that $(A, \mathcal A, P)$ is a probability space and that $(B, \mathcal B)$ is a measurable space whose underlying σ-algebra is discrete, so in particular contains singleton sets of $B$. In this setting, a random variable $X \colon A \to B$ is discrete provided its image is countable. The pushforward measure $X_{*}(P)$—called the distribution of $X$ in this context—is a probability measure on $B$ whose restriction to singleton sets induces the PMF (as mentioned in the previous section) $f_X \colon B \to \mathbb R$ since $f_X(b)=P( X^{-1}( b ))=P(X=b)$ for each $b \in B$.

Now suppose that $(B, \mathcal B, \mu)$ is a measure space equipped with the counting measure $\mu$. The probability density function $f$ of $X$ with respect to the counting measure, if it exists, is the Radon–Nikodym derivative of the pushforward measure of $X$ (with respect to the counting measure), so $f = d X_*P / d \mu$ and $f$ is a function from $B$ to the non-negative reals. As a consequence, for any $b \in B$ we have
$$P(X=b)=P( X^{-1}( b) ) = X_*(P)(b) = \int_{ b } f d \mu = f(b),$$

demonstrating that $f$ is in fact a PMF.

When there is a natural order among the potential outcomes $x$, it may be convenient to assign numerical values to them (or n-tuples in case of a discrete multivariate random variable) and to consider also values not in the image of $X$. That is, $f_X$ may be defined for all real numbers and $f_X(x)=0$ for all $x \notin X(S)$ as shown in the figure.

The image of $X$ has a countable subset on which the PMF $f_X(x)$ is one. Consequently, the PMF is zero for all but a countable number of values of $x$.

The discontinuity of PMFs is related to the fact that the cumulative distribution function of a discrete random variable is also discontinuous. If $X$ is a discrete random variable, then $P(X = x) = 1$ means that the casual event $(X = x)$ is certain (it is true in 100% of the occurrences); on the contrary, $P(X = x) = 0$ means that the casual event $(X = x)$ is always impossible. This statement isn't true for a continuous random variable $X$, for which $P(X = x) = 0$ for any possible $x$. Discretization is the process of converting a continuous random variable into a discrete one.

== Examples ==
=== Finite ===
There are three major distributions associated, the Bernoulli distribution, the binomial distribution and the geometric distribution.

- Bernoulli distribution: ber(p) , is used to model an experiment with only two possible outcomes. The two outcomes are often encoded as 1 and 0.
  $$p_X(x) = \begin{cases}
p, & \text{if }x\text{ is 1} \\
1-p, & \text{if }x\text{ is 0}
\end{cases}$$
  An example of the Bernoulli distribution is tossing a coin. Suppose that $S$ is the sample space of all outcomes of a single toss of a fair coin, and $X$ is the random variable defined on $S$ assigning 0 to the category "tails" and 1 to the category "heads". Since the coin is fair, the PMF is
  $$p_X(x) = \begin{cases}
\frac{1}{2}, &x = 0,\\
\frac{1}{2}, &x = 1,\\
0, &x \notin \{0, 1\}.
\end{cases}$$
- Binomial distribution, models the number of successes when someone draws n times with replacement. Each draw or experiment is independent, with two possible outcomes. The associated PMF is $\binom{n}{k} p^k (1-p)^{n-k}$.
  The PMF of a fair die. All the numbers on the die have an equal chance of appearing on top when the die stops rolling.
  An example of the binomial distribution is the probability of getting exactly one 6 when someone rolls a fair die three times.
- Geometric distribution describes the number of trials needed to get one success. Its PMF is $p_X(k) = (1-p)^{k-1} p$.
  An example is tossing a coin until the first "heads" appears. $p$ denotes the probability of the outcome "heads", and $k$ denotes the number of necessary coin tosses.
  Other distributions that can be modeled using a PMF are the categorical distribution (also known as the generalized Bernoulli distribution) and the multinomial distribution.
- If the discrete distribution has two or more categories one of which may occur, whether or not these categories have a natural ordering, when there is only a single trial (draw) this is a categorical distribution.
- An example of a multivariate discrete distribution, and of its PMF, is provided by the multinomial distribution. Here the multiple random variables are the numbers of successes in each of the categories after a given number of trials, and each non-zero probability mass gives the probability of a certain combination of numbers of successes in the various categories.

=== Infinite ===
The following exponentially declining distribution is an example of a distribution with an infinite number of possible outcomes—all the positive integers:
$$\text{Pr}(X=i)= \frac{1}{2^i}\qquad \text{for } i=1, 2, 3, \dots$$
Despite the infinite number of possible outcomes, the total probability mass is 1/2 + 1/4 + 1/8 + ⋯ = 1, satisfying the unit total probability requirement for a probability distribution.

== Multivariate case ==
Two or more discrete random variables have a joint PMF, which gives the probability of each possible combination of realizations for the random variables.
