= Continuity theorem =

In mathematics and statistics, the continuity theorem may refer to one of the following results:

- the Lévy continuity theorem on random variables;
- the Kolmogorov continuity theorem on stochastic processes.

== See also ==
- Continuity (disambiguation)
- Continuous mapping theorem
