= Weak convergence =

In mathematics, weak convergence may refer to:

- Weak convergence of random variables of a probability distribution
- Weak convergence of measures, of a sequence of probability measures
- Weak convergence (Hilbert space) of a sequence in a Hilbert space
  - more generally, convergence in weak topology in a Banach space or a topological vector space
