= Characteristic function (probability theory) =

Fourier transform of the probability density function

The characteristic function of a uniform U(–1,1) random variable. This function is real-valued because it corresponds to a random variable that is symmetric around the origin; however characteristic functions may generally be complex-valued.

In probability theory and statistics, the characteristic function of any real-valued random variable completely defines its probability distribution. If a random variable admits a probability density function, then the characteristic function is the Fourier transform (with sign reversal) of the probability density function. Thus it provides an alternative route to analytical results compared with working directly with probability density functions or cumulative distribution functions. There are particularly simple results for the characteristic functions of distributions defined by the weighted sums of random variables.

In addition to univariate distributions, characteristic functions can be defined for multivariate probability distributions of vector- or matrix-valued random variables, and can also be extended to more generic cases.

The characteristic function always exists when treated as a function of a real-valued argument, unlike the moment-generating function. There are relations between the behavior of the characteristic function of a distribution and properties of the distribution, such as the existence of moments and the existence of a density function.

== Introduction ==
The characteristic function is a way to describe a random variable X. The characteristic function,

$$\varphi_X(t) = \operatorname{E} \left [ e^{itX} \right ],$$

a function of t, determines the behavior and properties of the probability distribution of X. It is equivalent to a probability density function (if it exists) or cumulative distribution function, in the sense that knowing one of these functions allows computation of the others, but they provide different insights into the features of the random variable.

In particular cases, one or another of these equivalent functions may be easier to represent in terms of simple standard functions.

If a random variable admits a density function, then the characteristic function is its Fourier dual, in the sense that each of them is a Fourier transform of the other. If a random variable has a moment-generating function $M_X(t)$, then the domain of the characteristic function can be extended to the complex plane, and

$\varphi_X(-it) = M_X(t).$

Note however that the characteristic function of a distribution is well defined for all real values of t, even when the moment-generating function is not well defined for all real values of t.

The characteristic function approach is particularly useful in analysis of linear combinations of independent random variables: a classical proof of the Central Limit Theorem uses characteristic functions and Lévy's continuity theorem. Another important application is to the theory of the decomposability of random variables.

== Definition ==
Let $X$ be a real-valued random variable. Its characteristic function $\varphi_X:\mathbb{R}\to\mathbb{C}$ is defined for each $t\in\mathbb{R}$ as the expected value of $e^{itX}$, where $i$ is the imaginary unit.
$$\varphi_X(t) = \operatorname{E}\left[e^{itX}\right] = \int_{\mathbb{R}} e^{itx}\,dF_X(x) = \int_0^1 e^{it Q_X(p)}\,dp = \int_{\mathbb{R}} e^{itx} f_X(x)\,dx.$$
In the equalities, there is the cumulative distribution function $F_X$, the inverse cumulative distribution function $Q_X$ (also called the quantile function), and the density function $f_X$. The integrals are in the Riemann–Stieltjes sense. The last equality holds if $f_X$ exists, which then implies that $\varphi_X$ is its Fourier transform with sign reversal in the complex exponential. The convention for the constant appearing in the above definition differs from the usual convention for the Fourier transform. For example, some authors define $\varphi_X=\left[e^{-2\pi itX}\right]$, which is essentially a change of parameter. Other notation may be encountered in the literature: $\hat{p}$ as the characteristic function for a probability measure $p$, or $\hat{f}$ as the characteristic function corresponding to a density $f$.

== Generalizations ==
The notion of characteristic functions generalizes to multivariate random variables and more complicated random elements. The argument of the characteristic function will always belong to the continuous dual of the space where the random variable X takes its values. For common cases such definitions are listed below:

- If X is a k-dimensional random vector, then for t ∈ R^{k}
  $$\varphi_X(t) = \operatorname{E}\left[\exp( i t^T\!X)\right],$$
  where $t^T$ is the transpose of the vector $t$,
- If X is a k × p-dimensional random matrix, then for t ∈ R^{k×p}
  $$\varphi_X(t) = \operatorname{E}\left[\exp \left( i \operatorname{tr}(t^T\!X) \right )\right],$$
  where $\operatorname{tr}(\cdot)$ is the trace operator,
- If X is a complex random variable, then for t ∈ C
  $$\varphi_X(t) = \operatorname{E}\left[\exp\left( i \operatorname{Re}\left(\overline{t}X\right) \right)\right],$$
  where $\overline t$ is the complex conjugate of $t$ and $\operatorname{Re}(z)$ is the real part of the complex number $z$,
- If X is a k-dimensional complex random vector, then for t ∈ C^{k}
  $$\varphi_X(t) = \operatorname{E}\left[\exp(i\operatorname{Re}(t^*\!X))\right],$$
  where $t^*$ is the conjugate transpose of the vector $t$,
- If X(s) is a stochastic process, then for all functions t(s) such that the integral $\int_{\mathbb R} t(s)X(s)\,\mathrm{d}s$ converges for almost all realizations of X
  $$\varphi_X(t) = \operatorname{E}\left[\exp \left ( i\int_\mathbf{R} t(s)X(s) \, ds \right ) \right].$$

== Examples ==
Distribution	Characteristic function $\varphi(t)$
Degenerate δ_{a}	$e^{ita}$
Bernoulli Bern(p)	$1-p+pe^{it}$
Binomial B(n, p)	$(1-p+pe^{it})^n$
Negative binomial NB(r, p)	$\left(\frac{p}{1 - e^{it} + pe^{it}}\right)^r$
Poisson Pois(λ)	$e^{\lambda(e^{it}-1)}$
Uniform (continuous) U(a, b)	$\frac{e^{itb} - e^{ita}}{it(b-a)}$
Uniform (discrete) DU(a, b)	$\frac{e^{ita} - e^{it(b + 1)}}{(1 - e^{it})(b - a + 1)}$
Laplace L(μ, b)	$\frac{e^{it\mu}}{1 + b^2t^2}$
Logistic Logistic(μ,s)	$e^{i\mu t}\frac{\pi s t}{\sinh(\pi s t)}$
Normal N(μ, σ^{2})	$e^{it\mu - \frac{1}{2}\sigma^2t^2}$
Chi-squared χ^{2}_{k}	$(1 - 2it)^{-k/2}$
Noncentral chi-squared ${\chi'_k}^2$	$e^{\frac{i\lambda t}{1-2it}}(1 - 2it)^{-k/2}$
Generalized chi-squared $\tilde{\chi}(\boldsymbol{w}, \boldsymbol{k}, \boldsymbol{\lambda},s,m)$	$\frac{\exp\left[it \left( m + \sum_j \frac{w_j \lambda_j}{1-2i w_j t} \right)-\frac{s^2 t^2}{2}\right]}{\prod_j \left(1-2i w_j t \right)^{k_j/2}}$
Cauchy C(μ, θ)	$e^{it\mu -\theta|t|}$
Gamma Γ(k, θ)	$(1 - it\theta)^{-k}$
Exponential Exp(λ)	$(1 - it\lambda^{-1})^{-1}$
Geometric Gf(p) (number of failures)	$\frac{p}{1-e^{it}(1-p)}$
Geometric Gt(p) (number of trials)	$\frac{p}{e^{-it}-(1-p)}$
Multivariate normal N(μ, Σ)	$e^{i{ \mathbf{t}^{\mathrm{T}} \boldsymbol{\mu}}-\frac {1}{2} \mathbf{t}^{\mathrm{T}}\boldsymbol{\Sigma} \mathbf{t}}$
Multivariate Cauchy MultiCauchy(μ, Σ)	$e^{i\mathbf{t}^{\mathrm{T}}\boldsymbol\mu - \sqrt{\mathbf{t}^{\mathrm{T}}\boldsymbol{\Sigma} \mathbf{t}}}$

Oberhettinger (1973) provides extensive tables of characteristic functions.

== Properties ==
- The characteristic function of a real-valued random variable always exists, since it is an integral of a bounded continuous function over a space whose measure is finite.
- A characteristic function is uniformly continuous on the entire space.
- It is non-vanishing in a region around zero: φ(0) = 1.
- It is bounded: |φ(t)| ≤ 1.
- It is Hermitian: φ(−t) = φ̅(t̅). In particular, the characteristic function of a symmetric (around the origin) random variable is real-valued and even.
- There is a bijection between probability distributions and characteristic functions on $\mathbf{R}^k$, $k\in\N$. That is, for any two random variables X_{1}, X_{2}, with values in $\mathbf{R}^k$, both have the same probability distribution if and only if $\varphi_{X_1}=\varphi_{X_2}$.
- If a random variable X has moments up to k-th order, then the characteristic function φ_{X} is k times continuously differentiable on the entire real line. In this case
  $$\operatorname{E}[X^k] = i^{-k} \varphi_X^{(k)}(0).$$
- If a characteristic function φ_{X} has a k-th derivative at zero, then the random variable X has all moments up to k if k is even, but only up to k – 1 if k is odd.
  $$\varphi_X^{(k)}(0) = i^k \operatorname{E}[X^k]$$
- If X_{1}, ..., X_{n} are independent random variables, and a_{1}, ..., a_{n} are some constants, then the characteristic function of the linear combination of the X_{i} variables is
  $$\varphi_{a_1X_1+\cdots+a_nX_n}(t) = \varphi_{X_1}(a_1t)\cdots \varphi_{X_n}(a_nt).$$
  One specific case is the sum of two independent random variables X_{1} and X_{2} in which case one has
  $$\varphi_{X_1+X_2}(t) = \varphi_{X_1}(t)\cdot\varphi_{X_2}(t).$$
- Let $X$ and $Y$ be two random variables with characteristic functions $\varphi_{X}$ and $\varphi_{Y}$. $X$ and $Y$ are independent if and only if $\varphi_{X, Y}(s, t)= \varphi_{X}(s) \varphi_{Y}(t) \quad \text { for all } \quad(s, t) \in \mathbb{R}^{2}$.
- The tail behavior of the characteristic function determines the smoothness of the corresponding density function.
- Let the random variable $Y = aX + b$ be the linear transformation of a random variable $X$. The characteristic function of $Y$ is $\varphi_Y(t)=e^{itb}\varphi_X(at)$. For random vectors $X$ and $Y = AX + B$ (where A is a constant matrix and B a constant vector), we have $\varphi_Y(t) = e^{it^\top B}\varphi_X(A^\top t)$.

=== Continuity ===
The bijection stated above between probability distributions and characteristic functions is sequentially continuous. That is, whenever a sequence of distribution functions F_{j}(x) converges (weakly) to some distribution F(x), the corresponding sequence of characteristic functions φ_{j}(t) will also converge, and the limit φ(t) will correspond to the characteristic function of law F. More formally, this is stated as

Lévy’s continuity theorem: A sequence X_{j} of n-variate random variables converges in distribution to random variable X if and only if the sequence φ_{X_{j}} converges pointwise to a function φ which is continuous at the origin. Where φ is the characteristic function of X.

This theorem can be used to prove the law of large numbers and the central limit theorem.

=== Inversion formula ===
There is a one-to-one correspondence between cumulative distribution functions and characteristic functions, so it is possible to find one of these functions if we know the other. The formula in the definition of characteristic function allows us to compute φ when we know the distribution function F (or density f). If, on the other hand, we know the characteristic function φ and want to find the corresponding distribution function, then one of the following inversion theorems can be used.

Theorem. If the characteristic function φ_{X} of a random variable X is integrable, then F_{X} is absolutely continuous, and therefore X has a probability density function. In the univariate case (i.e. when X is scalar-valued) the density function is given by
$$f_X(x) = F_X'(x) = \frac{1}{2\pi}\int_{\mathbf{R}} e^{-itx}\varphi_X(t)\,dt.$$

In the multivariate case it is
$$f_X(x) = \frac{1}{(2\pi)^n} \int_{\mathbf{R}^n} e^{-i(t\cdot x)}\varphi_X(t)\lambda(dt)$$

where $t\cdot x$ is the dot product.

The density function is the Radon–Nikodym derivative of the distribution μ_{X} with respect to the Lebesgue measure λ:
$$f_X(x) = \frac{d\mu_X}{d\lambda}(x).$$

Theorem (Lévy). (Note: named after the French mathematician Paul Lévy) If φ_{X} is characteristic function of distribution function F_{X}, two points a < b are such that {x | a < x < b} is a continuity set of μ_{X} (in the univariate case this condition is equivalent to continuity of F_{X} at points a and b), then

- If X is scalar:
  $$F_X(b) - F_X(a) = \frac{1} {2\pi} \lim_{T \to \infty} \int_{-T}^{+T} \frac{e^{-ita} - e^{-itb}} {it}\, \varphi_X(t)\, dt.$$
  This formula can be re-stated in a form more convenient for numerical computation as
  $$\frac{F(x+h) - F(x-h)}{2h} = \frac{1}{2\pi} \int_{-\infty}^{\infty} \frac{\sin ht}{ht} e^{-itx} \varphi_X(t) \, dt .$$
  For a random variable bounded from below one can obtain $F(b)$ by taking $a$ such that $F(a)=0.$ Otherwise, if a random variable is not bounded from below, the limit for $a\to-\infty$ gives $F(b)$, but is numerically impractical.
- If X is a vector random variable:
  $$\mu_X\big(\{a<x<b\}\big) = \frac{1}{(2\pi)^n} \lim_{T_1\to\infty}\cdots\lim_{T_n\to\infty} \int\limits_{-T_1\leq t_1\leq T_1} \cdots \int\limits_{-T_n \leq t_n \leq T_n} \prod_{k=1}^n\left(\frac{e^{-i t_k a_k}-e^{-i t_k b_k}}{it_k}\right)\varphi_X(t)\lambda(dt_1 \times \cdots \times dt_n)$$

Theorem. If a is (possibly) an atom of X (in the univariate case this means a point of discontinuity of F_{X}) then

- If X is scalar:
  $$F_X(a) - F_X(a-0) = \lim_{T\to\infty}\frac{1}{2T} \int_{-T}^{+T} e^{-ita}\varphi_X(t)\,dt$$
- If X is a vector random variable:
  $$\mu_X(\{a\}) = \lim_{T_1\to\infty}\cdots\lim_{T_n\to\infty} \left(\prod_{k=1}^n\frac{1}{2T_k}\right) \int\limits_{[-T_1, T_1] \times \dots \times [-T_n, T_n]} e^{-i(t\cdot a)}\varphi_X(t)\lambda(dt)$$

Theorem (Gil-Pelaez). For a univariate random variable X, if x is a continuity point of F_{X} then

$$F_X(x) = \frac{1}{2} - \frac{1}{\pi}\int_0^\infty \frac{\operatorname{Im}[e^{-itx}\varphi_X(t)]}{t}\,dt$$

where the imaginary part of a complex number $z$ is given by $\mathrm{Im}(z) = (z - z^*)/2i$.

And its density function is:

$$f_X(x) = \frac{1}{\pi}\int_0^\infty \operatorname{Re}[e^{-itx}\varphi_X(t)]\,dt$$

The integral may be not Lebesgue-integrable; for example, when X is the discrete random variable that is always 0, it becomes the Dirichlet integral.

Inversion formulas for multivariate distributions are available.

=== Criteria for characteristic functions ===
The set of all characteristic functions is closed under certain operations:

- A convex linear combination $\sum_n a_n\varphi_n(t)$ (with $a_n\geq0,\ \sum_n a_n=1$) of a finite or a countable number of characteristic functions is also a characteristic function.
- The product of a finite number of characteristic functions is also a characteristic function. The same holds for an infinite product provided that it converges to a function continuous at the origin.
- If φ is a characteristic function and α is a real number, then $\bar{\varphi}$, Re(φ), |φ|^{2}, and φ(αt) are also characteristic functions.

It is well known that any non-decreasing càdlàg function F with limits F(−∞) = 0, F(+∞) = 1 corresponds to a cumulative distribution function of some random variable. There is also interest in finding similar simple criteria for when a given function φ could be the characteristic function of some random variable. The central result here is Bochner’s theorem, although its usefulness is limited because the main condition of the theorem, non-negative definiteness, is very hard to verify. Other theorems also exist, such as Khinchine’s, Mathias’s, or Cramér’s, although their application is just as difficult. Pólya’s theorem, on the other hand, provides a very simple convexity condition which is sufficient but not necessary. Characteristic functions which satisfy this condition are called Pólya-type.

Bochner’s theorem. An arbitrary function φ : R^{n} → C is the characteristic function of some random variable if and only if φ is positive definite, continuous at the origin, and if φ(0) = 1.

Khinchine’s criterion. A complex-valued, absolutely continuous function φ, with φ(0) = 1, is a characteristic function if and only if it admits the representation

$$\varphi(t) = \int_{\mathbf{R}} g(t+\theta)\overline{g(\theta)} \,  d\theta .$$

Mathias’ theorem. A real-valued, even, continuous, absolutely integrable function φ, with φ(0) = 1, is a characteristic function if and only if

$$(-1)^n \left ( \int_{\mathbf{R}} \varphi(pt)e^{-t^2/2} H_{2n}(t) \, dt \right ) \geq 0$$

for n = 0,1,2,..., and all p > 0. Here H_{2n} denotes the Hermite polynomial of degree 2n.

Pólya’s theorem can be used to construct an example of two random variables whose characteristic functions coincide over a finite interval but are different elsewhere.

Pólya’s theorem. If $\varphi$ is a real-valued, even, continuous function which satisfies the conditions

- $\varphi(0) = 1$,
- $\varphi$ is convex for $t>0$,
- $\varphi(\infty) = 0$,

then φ(t) is the characteristic function of an absolutely continuous distribution symmetric about 0.

== Uses ==
Because of the continuity theorem, characteristic functions are used in the most frequently seen proof of the central limit theorem. The main technique involved in making calculations with a characteristic function is recognizing the function as the characteristic function of a particular distribution.

=== Basic manipulations of distributions ===
Characteristic functions are particularly useful for dealing with linear functions of independent random variables. For example, if X_{1}, X_{2}, ..., X_{n} is a sequence of independent (and not necessarily identically distributed) random variables, and

$$S_n = \sum_{i=1}^n a_i X_i,\,\!$$

where the a_{i} are constants, then the characteristic function for S_{n} is given by

$$\varphi_{S_n}(t)=\varphi_{X_1}(a_1t)\varphi_{X_2}(a_2t)\cdots \varphi_{X_n}(a_nt) \,\!$$

In particular, φ_{X+Y}(t) = φ_{X}(t)φ_{Y}(t). To see this, write out the definition of characteristic function:

$$\varphi_{X+Y}(t)=  \operatorname{E}\left [e^{it(X+Y)}\right]= \operatorname{E}\left [e^{itX}e^{itY}\right] =  \operatorname{E}\left [e^{itX}\right] \operatorname{E}\left [e^{itY}\right] =\varphi_X(t) \varphi_Y(t)$$

The independence of X and Y is required to establish the equality of the third and fourth expressions.

Another special case of interest for identically distributed random variables is when a_{i} = 1 / n and then S_{n} is the sample mean. In this case, writing X̅ for the mean,

$$\varphi_{\overline{X}}(t)= \varphi_X\!\left(\tfrac{t}{n} \right)^n$$

=== Moments ===
Characteristic functions can also be used to find moments of a random variable. Provided that the n-^{th} moment exists, the characteristic function can be differentiated n times:

$$\operatorname{E}\left[ X^n\right] = i^{-n}\left[\frac{d^n}{dt^n}\varphi_X(t)\right]_{t=0} = i^{-n}\varphi_X^{(n)}(0) ,\!$$

This can be formally written using the derivatives of the Dirac delta function:
$$f_X(x) = \sum_{n=0}^\infty \frac{(-1)^n}{n!}\delta^{(n)}(x)\operatorname{E}[X^n]$$
which allows a formal solution to the moment problem. For example, suppose X has a standard Cauchy distribution. Then φ_{X}(t) = e^{−|t|}. This is not differentiable at t = 0, showing that the Cauchy distribution has no expectation. Also, the characteristic function of the sample mean X̅ of n independent observations has characteristic function φ_{X̅}(t) = (e^{−|t|/n})^{n} = e^{−|t|}, using the result from the previous section. This is the characteristic function of the standard Cauchy distribution: thus, the sample mean has the same distribution as the population itself.

As a further example, suppose X follows a Gaussian distribution i.e. $X \sim \mathcal{N}(\mu,\sigma^2)$. Then $\varphi_{X}(t) = e^{\mu i t - \frac{1}{2} \sigma^2 t^2}$ and

$$\operatorname{E}\left[ X\right] = i^{-1} \left[\frac{d}{dt}\varphi_X(t)\right]_{t=0} = i^{-1} \left[(i \mu - \sigma^2 t) \varphi_X(t) \right]_{t=0} = \mu$$

A similar calculation shows $\operatorname{E}\left[ X^2\right] = \mu^2 + \sigma^2$ and is easier to carry out than applying the definition of expectation and using integration by parts to evaluate $\operatorname{E}\left[ X^2\right]$.

The logarithm of a characteristic function is a cumulant generating function, which is useful for finding cumulants; some instead define the cumulant generating function as the logarithm of the moment-generating function, and call the logarithm of the characteristic function the second cumulant generating function.

=== Data analysis ===
Characteristic functions can be used as part of procedures for fitting probability distributions to samples of data. Cases where this provides a practicable option compared to other possibilities include fitting the stable distribution since closed form expressions for the density are not available which makes implementation of maximum likelihood estimation difficult. Estimation procedures are available which match the theoretical characteristic function to the empirical characteristic function, calculated from the data. Paulson et al. (1975) and Heathcote (1977) provide some theoretical background for such an estimation procedure. In addition, Yu (2004) describes applications of empirical characteristic functions to fit time series models where likelihood procedures are impractical. Empirical characteristic functions have also been used by Ansari et al. (2020) and Li et al. (2020) for training generative adversarial networks.

=== Example ===
The gamma distribution with scale parameter θ and a shape parameter k has the characteristic function

$$(1 - \theta i t)^{-k}.$$

Now suppose that we have

$$X ~\sim \Gamma(k_1,\theta) \mbox{ and } Y \sim \Gamma(k_2,\theta)$$

with X and Y independent from each other, and we wish to know what the distribution of X + Y is. The characteristic functions are

$$\varphi_X(t)=(1 - \theta i t)^{-k_1},\,\qquad \varphi_Y(t)=(1 - \theta it)^{-k_2}$$

which by independence and the basic properties of characteristic function leads to

$$\varphi_{X+Y}(t)=\varphi_X(t)\varphi_Y(t)=(1 - \theta i t)^{-k_1}(1 - \theta i t)^{-k_2}=\left(1 - \theta i t\right)^{-(k_1+k_2)}.$$

This is the characteristic function of the gamma distribution scale parameter θ and shape parameter k_{1} + k_{2}, and we therefore conclude

$$X+Y \sim \Gamma(k_1+k_2,\theta)$$

The result can be expanded to n independent gamma distributed random variables with the same scale parameter and we get

$$\forall i \in \{1,\ldots, n\} :  X_i \sim \Gamma(k_i,\theta) \qquad \Rightarrow \qquad \sum_{i=1}^n X_i \sim \Gamma\left(\sum_{i=1}^nk_i,\theta\right).$$

== Entire characteristic functions ==
As defined above, the argument of the characteristic function is treated as a real number: however, certain aspects of the theory of characteristic functions are advanced by extending the definition into the complex plane by analytic continuation, in cases where this is possible.

== Characteristic function of a random variable with values in a locally compact Abelian group ==
Let $X$ be a locally compact Abelian group, let $Y$ be its character group, and let $(x, y)$ the value of a character $y \in Y$ at an element $x \in X$. Let $\xi$ be a random variable with values in $X$, and let $\mu$ be its distribution. The characteristic function of the random variable $\xi$ (distribution $\mu$) is defined by

$$\mathbf{E}[(\xi, y)]=\widehat{\mu}(y) = \int_X (x, y)\, d\mu(x), \quad y \in Y.$$

== Related concepts ==
Related concepts include the moment-generating function and the probability-generating function. The characteristic function exists for all probability distributions. This is not the case for the moment-generating function.

The characteristic function is closely related to the Fourier transform: the characteristic function of a probability density function p(x) is the complex conjugate of the continuous Fourier transform of p(x) (according to the usual convention; see continuous Fourier transform – other conventions).

$$\varphi_X(t) = \langle e^{itX} \rangle = \int_{\mathbf{R}} e^{itx}p(x)\, dx = \overline{\left( \int_{\mathbf{R}} e^{-itx}p(x)\, dx \right)} = \overline{P(t)},$$

where P(t) denotes the continuous Fourier transform of the probability density function p(x). Likewise, p(x) may be recovered from φ_{X}(t) through the inverse Fourier transform:

$$p(x) = \frac{1}{2\pi} \int_{\mathbf{R}} e^{itx} P(t)\, dt = \frac{1}{2\pi} \int_{\mathbf{R}} e^{itx} \overline{\varphi_X(t)}\, dt.$$

Indeed, even when the random variable does not have a density, the characteristic function may be seen as the Fourier transform of the measure corresponding to the random variable.

Another related concept is the representation of probability distributions as elements of a reproducing kernel Hilbert space via the kernel embedding of distributions. This framework may be viewed as a generalization of the characteristic function under specific choices of the kernel function.

== See also ==
- Subindependence, a weaker condition than independence, that is defined in terms of characteristic functions.
- Cumulant, a term of the cumulant generating functions, which are logs of the characteristic functions.
