= Slutsky's theorem =

Theorem in probability theory

In probability theory, Slutsky's theorem extends some properties of algebraic operations on convergent sequences of real numbers to sequences of random variables.

The theorem was named after Eugen Slutsky. Slutsky's theorem is also attributed to Harald Cramér.

== Statement ==
Let $X_n, Y_n$ be sequences of scalar/vector/matrix random elements. If $X_n$ converges in distribution to a random element $X$ and $Y_n$ converges in probability to a constant $c$, then

- $X_n + Y_n \ \xrightarrow{d}\ X + c ;$
- $X_nY_n \ \xrightarrow{d}\ Xc ;$
- $X_n/Y_n \ \xrightarrow{d}\ X/c,$ provided that c is non-zero,

where $\xrightarrow{d}$ denotes convergence in distribution.

Notes:

1. The requirement that Y_{n} converges to a constant is important — if it were to converge to a non-degenerate random variable, the theorem would be no longer valid. For example, let $X_n \sim {\rm Uniform}(0,1)$ and $Y_n = -X_n$. The sum $X_n + Y_n = 0$ for all values of n. Moreover, $Y_n \, \xrightarrow{d} \, {\rm Uniform}(-1,0)$, but $X_n + Y_n$ does not converge in distribution to $X + Y$, where $X \sim {\rm Uniform}(0,1)$, $Y \sim {\rm Uniform}(-1,0)$, and $X$ and $Y$ are independent.
2. The theorem remains valid if we replace all convergences in distribution with convergences in probability.

== Proof ==
This theorem follows from the fact that if X_{n} converges in distribution to X and Y_{n} converges in probability to a constant c, then the joint vector (X_{n}, Y_{n}) converges in distribution to (X, c) (see here).

Next we apply the continuous mapping theorem, recognizing the functions g(x,y) = x + y, g(x,y) = xy, and g(x,y) = x y^{−1} are continuous (for the last function to be continuous, y has to be invertible).

== See also ==
- Convergence of random variables
