= Continuous mapping theorem =

Probability theorem

In probability theory, the continuous mapping theorem states that continuous functions preserve limits even if their arguments are sequences of random variables. A continuous function, in Heine's definition, is such a function that maps convergent sequences into convergent sequences: if x_{n} → x then g(x_{n}) → g(x). The continuous mapping theorem states that this will also be true if we replace the deterministic sequence {x_{n}} with a sequence of random variables {X_{n}}, and replace the standard notion of convergence of real numbers “→” with one of the types of convergence of random variables.

This theorem was first proved by Henry Mann and Abraham Wald in 1943, and it is therefore sometimes called the Mann–Wald theorem. Meanwhile, Denis Sargan refers to it as the general transformation theorem.

== Statement ==
Let {X_{n}}, X be random elements defined on a metric space S. Suppose a function g: S→S′ (where S′ is another metric space) has the set of discontinuity points D_{g} such that Pr[X ∈ D_{g}] = 0. Then

$$\begin{align}
X_n \ \xrightarrow\text{d}\ X \quad & \Rightarrow\quad g(X_n)\ \xrightarrow\text{d}\ g(X); \\[6pt]
X_n \ \xrightarrow\text{p}\ X \quad & \Rightarrow\quad g(X_n)\ \xrightarrow\text{p}\ g(X); \\[6pt]
X_n \ \xrightarrow{\!\!\text{a.s.}\!\!}\ X \quad & \Rightarrow\quad g(X_n)\ \xrightarrow{\!\!\text{a.s.}\!\!}\ g(X).
\end{align}$$

where the superscripts, "d", "p", and "a.s." denote convergence in distribution, convergence in probability, and almost sure convergence respectively.

== Proof ==
This proof has been adopted from (van der Vaart 1998, Theorem 2.3)

Spaces S and S′ are equipped with certain metrics. For simplicity we will denote both of these metrics using the |x − y| notation, even though the metrics may be arbitrary and not necessarily Euclidean.

=== Convergence in distribution ===
We will need a particular statement from the portmanteau theorem: that convergence in distribution $X_n\xrightarrow{d}X$ is equivalent to

$\mathbb E f(X_n) \to \mathbb E f(X)$ for every bounded continuous functional f.

So it suffices to prove that $\mathbb E f(g(X_n)) \to \mathbb E f(g(X))$ for every bounded continuous functional f. For simplicity we assume g continuous. Note that $F = f \circ g$ is itself a bounded continuous functional. And so the claim follows from the statement above. The general case is slightly more technical.

=== Convergence in probability ===
Fix an arbitrary ε > 0. Then for any δ > 0 consider the set B_{δ} defined as

$$B_\delta = \big\{x\in S \mid x\notin D_g:\ \exists y\in S:\ |x-y|<\delta,\, |g(x)-g(y)|>\varepsilon\big\}.$$

This is the set of continuity points x of the function g(·) for which it is possible to find, within the δ-neighborhood of x, a point which maps outside the ε-neighborhood of g(x). By definition of continuity, this set shrinks as δ goes to zero, so that lim_{δ → 0}B_{δ} = ∅.

Now suppose that |g(X) − g(X_{n})| > ε. This implies that at least one of the following is true: either |X−X_{n}| ≥ δ, or X ∈ D_{g}, or X∈B_{δ}. In terms of probabilities this can be written as

$$\Pr\big(\big|g(X_n)-g(X)\big|>\varepsilon\big) \leq
\Pr\big(|X_n-X|\geq\delta\big) + \Pr(X\in B_\delta) + \Pr(X\in D_g).$$

On the right-hand side, the first term converges to zero as n → ∞ for any fixed δ, by the definition of convergence in probability of the sequence {X_{n}}. The second term converges to zero as δ → 0, since the set B_{δ} shrinks to an empty set. And the last term is identically equal to zero by assumption of the theorem. Therefore, the conclusion is that

$$\lim_{n\to\infty}\Pr \big(\big|g(X_n)-g(X)\big|>\varepsilon\big) = 0,$$

which means that g(X_{n}) converges to g(X) in probability.

Note: The above proof treats $B_\delta$ as a Borel subset of $S$, which is not clear in general. This can be circumvented easily as follows. By assumption, we have $\mathbb{P}\left(\bigcup_{k\geq1}A_k\right)=1$, where $A_k$ is the event "for all $n\geq1$ such that $|X_n-X|\leq1/k$, we have $|g(X_n)-g(X)|<\varepsilon$":
$$A_k=\bigcap_{n\geq1}\left(|X_n-X|\leq\frac{1}{k}\,\Rightarrow\,|g(X_n)-g(X)|<\varepsilon\right).$$
Now, fix an arbitrary $\eta>0$. Since the sequence $(A_k)_{k\geq1}$ is non-decreasing, we have $\mathbb{P}\left(\bigcup_{k\geq1}A_k\right)=\lim_{k\to\infty}\mathbb{P}(A_k)$, hence there exists $k\geq1$ such that $\mathbb{P}(A_k)\geq1-\eta$. Finally, we can write

$$\mathbb{P}(|g(X_n)-g(X)|\geq\varepsilon)\leq\eta+\mathbb{P}(|g(X_n)-g(X)|\geq\varepsilon\,;\,A_k)\leq\eta+\mathbb{P}\left(d(X_n,X)>\frac{1}{k}\right).$$

It follows that $\varlimsup_{n\to\infty}\mathbb{P}(|g(X_n)-g(X)|\geq\varepsilon)\leq\eta+0=\eta$, which shows that $\mathbb{P}(|g(X_n)-g(X)|\geq\varepsilon)\rightarrow0$ as $n\to\infty$, since $\eta$ was arbitrary.

=== Almost sure convergence ===
By definition of the continuity of the function g(·),

$$\lim_{n\to\infty}X_n(\omega) = X(\omega) \quad\Rightarrow\quad \lim_{n\to\infty}g(X_n(\omega)) = g(X(\omega))$$

at each point X(ω) where g(·) is continuous. Therefore,

$$\begin{align}
\Pr\left(\lim_{n\to\infty}g(X_n) = g(X)\right)
&\geq \Pr\left(\lim_{n\to\infty}g(X_n) = g(X),\ X\notin D_g\right) \\
&\geq \Pr\left(\lim_{n\to\infty}X_n = X,\ X\notin D_g\right)  = 1,
\end{align}$$

because the intersection of two almost sure events is almost sure.

By definition, we conclude that g(X_{n}) converges to g(X) almost surely.

== See also ==
- Slutsky's theorem
- Portmanteau theorem
- Pushforward measure
