= Continuum =

Continuum may refer to:

- Continuum (measurement), theories or models that explain gradual transitions from one condition to another without abrupt changes

== Mathematics ==
- Continuum (set theory), the real line or the corresponding cardinal number
- Linear continuum, any ordered set that shares certain properties of the real line
- Continuum (topology), a nonempty compact connected metric space (sometimes Hausdorff space)
- Continuum hypothesis, the hypothesis that no infinite sets are larger than the integers but smaller than the real numbers
- Cardinality of the continuum, a cardinal number that represents the size of the set of real numbers

== Science ==
- Continuum morphology, in plant morphology, underlining the continuum between morphological categories
- Continuum concept, in psychology
- Continuum (physics), continuous media
- Space-time continuum, any mathematical model that combines space and time into a single continuum
- Continuum theory of specific heats of solids, see Debye model
- Triune continuum, trinity of continual representations in general system modeling defined in the theory of triune continuum, used in the triune continuum paradigm
- Continuous spectrum, referred to simply as the continuum in contrast to discrete spectral lines

== Arts and entertainment ==
=== Film and television ===
- Continuum (film), or I'll Follow You Down, a 2013 Canadian film
- Stargate: Continuum, a 2008 direct-to-DVD film in the Stargate franchise
- Continuum (TV series), a 2012–2015 Canadian science fiction series
- "Continuum" (American Horror Story), a 2013 television episode
- Q Continuum, an alternate dimension for godlike entities in the fictional Star Trek universe

=== Games ===
- Continuum (game client), a game client for the SubSpace computer game
- Continuum (play-by-mail game), a 1990s science fiction play-by-mail game
- Continuum (role-playing game), a time travel role-playing game
- The Continuum, a browser-based fantasy collectible wargame
- Alpha Waves, released in North America as Continuum, a 1990 3D video game
- Command & Conquer: Continuum, a cancelled MMORPG in the Command & Conquer series

=== Music ===
- Continuum (Ligeti), a composition for harpsichord by György Ligeti, 1968
- Continuum Fingerboard, a continuous pitch performance controller developed by Haken Audio

==== Performers ====
- Continuum (chamber ensemble), an American classical chamber music ensemble
- Continuum (jazz group), with Slide Hampton, Jimmy Heath, Ron Carter, Art Taylor, Kenny Barron
- Continuum (music project), a collaboration between Steven Wilson and Dirk Serries

==== Albums ====
- Continuum (The Components album), 2018
- Continuum (Fly to the Sky album), 2014
- Continuum (John Mayer album), 2006
- Continuum (Mentallo & The Fixer album) or the title song, 1995
- Continuum (Nik Bärtsch album), 2016
- Continuum (Prototype album), 2006
- Continuum (Rainer Brüninghaus album) or the title song, 1983
- Continuum (Ray Drummond album), 1994
- The Continuum (album), by Ethnic Heritage Ensemble, or the title song, 1997
- Continuum (EP), a 2023 EP by VIXX

==== Songs ====
- "Continuum", by At the Drive-In from In•ter a•li•a, 2017
- "Continuum", by Defecation from Intention Surpassed, 2003
- "Continuum", by Erra from Drift, 2016
- "Continuum", by Imminence from The Black, 2024
- "Continuum", by Jaco Pastorius from Jaco Pastorius, 1976
- "Continuum", by Opeth from In Cauda Venenum, 2019
- "Continuum", by Tycho from Epoch, 2016

=== Print ===
- Continuum (journal), an academic journal of media and cultural studies
- Continuum (magazine), a 1992–2001 pseudoscientific magazine
- Continüm Comics, a 1988–1994 American comic book publisher
- Continuum International Publishing Group, an independent academic publisher in London and New York
- Continuum, a 1974–1975 series of science fiction anthologies edited by Roger Elwood
- Continuum, a journal published by the American Academy of Neurology

=== Other arts and entertainment ===
- Continuum (art fair), an annual event in West Palm Beach, Florida, US
- Continuum (sculpture), a 1976 public artwork by Charles O. Perry

== Other ==
- Continuum (dream), a type of false awakening
- Dialect continuum, the transition of one language to another through speech variations
- Continuing Anglican movement, a.k.a. Continuum, dissenting churches who have left the Anglican Communion
- Shailesh J. Mehta School of Management § Continuum, the rolling seminar series, an annual event at the school
- Consciousness Continuum, or the Mind Stream in Buddhism
- Continuum Morphology, an interpretation of morphology in biology proposed by Rolf Sattler
- Apache Continuum, a continuous integration server for building Java-based projects
- Windows 10 feature, that allows a 2-in-1 PC to transition from a traditional desktop UI to a tablet UI

== See also ==
- Continuity (disambiguation)
- Kontinuum, Icelandic music band
- Kontinuum (album), a 2007 album by Klaus Schulze
