= Positive-definite function =

Bimodal function

In mathematics, a positive-definite function is, depending on the context, either of two types of function.

== Definition 1 ==
Let $\mathbb{R}$ be the set of real numbers and $\mathbb{C}$ be the set of complex numbers.

A function $f: \mathbb{R} \to \mathbb{C}$ is called positive semi-definite if for all real numbers x_{1}, …, x_{n} the n × n matrix

$$A = \left(a_{ij}\right)_{i,j=1}^n~, \quad a_{ij} = f(x_i - x_j)$$

is a positive semi-definite matrix.

By definition, a positive semi-definite matrix, such as $A$, is Hermitian; therefore f(−x) is the complex conjugate of f(x)).

In particular, it is necessary (but not sufficient) that

$$f(0) \geq 0~, \quad |f(x)| \leq f(0)$$

(these inequalities follow from the condition for n = 1, 2.)

A function is negative semi-definite if the inequality is reversed. A function is definite if the weak inequality is replaced with a strong (<, > 0).

=== Examples ===
If $(X, \langle \cdot, \cdot \rangle)$ is a real inner product space, then $g_y \colon X \to \mathbb{C}$, $x \mapsto \exp(i \langle y, x \rangle)$ is positive definite for every $y \in X$: for all $u \in \mathbb{C}^n$ and all $x_1, \ldots, x_n$ we have

$$u^* A^{(g_y)} u
= \sum_{j, k = 1}^{n} \overline{u_k} u_j e^{i \langle y, x_k - x_j \rangle}
= \sum_{k = 1}^{n} \overline{u_k} e^{i \langle y, x_k \rangle} \sum_{j = 1}^{n} u_j e^{- i \langle y, x_j \rangle}
= \left| \sum_{j = 1}^{n} \overline{u_j} e^{i \langle y, x_j \rangle} \right|^2
\ge 0.$$

As nonnegative linear combinations of positive definite functions are again positive definite, the cosine function is positive definite as a nonnegative linear combination of the above functions:

$$\cos(x) = \frac{1}{2} ( e^{i x} + e^{- i x}) = \frac{1}{2}(g_{1} + g_{-1}).$$

One can create a positive definite function $f \colon X \to \mathbb{C}$ easily from positive definite function $f \colon \R \to \mathbb C$ for any vector space $X$: choose a linear function $\phi \colon X \to \R$ and define $f^* := f \circ \phi$. Then

$$u^* A^{(f^*)} u
= \sum_{j, k = 1}^{n} \overline{u_k} u_j f^*(x_k - x_j)
= \sum_{j, k = 1}^{n} \overline{u_k} u_j f(\phi(x_k) - \phi(x_j))
= u^* \tilde{A}^{(f)} u
\ge 0,$$

where $\tilde{A}^{(f)} = \big( f(\phi(x_i) - \phi(x_j)) = f(\tilde{x}_i - \tilde{x}_j) \big)_{i, j}$ where $\tilde{x}_k := \phi(x_k)$ are distinct as $\phi$ is linear.

=== Bochner's theorem ===
Positive-definiteness arises naturally in the theory of the Fourier transform; it can be seen directly that to be positive-definite it is sufficient for f to be the Fourier transform of a function g on the real line with g(y) ≥ 0.

The converse result is Bochner's theorem, stating that any continuous positive-definite function on the real line is the Fourier transform of a (positive) measure.

==== Applications ====
In statistics, and especially Bayesian statistics, the theorem is usually applied to real functions. Typically, n scalar measurements of some scalar value at points in $R^d$ are taken and points that are mutually close are required to have measurements that are highly correlated. In practice, one must be careful to ensure that the resulting covariance matrix (an n × n matrix) is always positive-definite. One strategy is to define a correlation matrix A which is then multiplied by a scalar to give a covariance matrix: this must be positive-definite. Bochner's theorem states that if the correlation between two points is dependent only upon the distance between them (via function f), then function f must be positive-definite to ensure the covariance matrix A is positive-definite. See Kriging.

In this context, Fourier terminology is not normally used and instead it is stated that f(x) is the characteristic function of a symmetric probability density function (PDF).

=== Generalization ===
One can define positive-definite functions on any locally compact abelian topological group; Bochner's theorem extends to this context. Positive-definite functions on groups occur naturally in the representation theory of groups on Hilbert spaces (i.e. the theory of unitary representations).

== Definition 2 ==
Alternatively, a function $f : \reals^n \to \reals$ is called positive-definite on a neighborhood D of the origin if $f(0) = 0$ and $f(x) > 0$ for every non-zero $x \in D$.

Note that this definition conflicts with definition 1, given above.

In physics, the requirement that $f(0) = 0$ is sometimes dropped (see, e.g., Corney and Olsen).

== See also ==
- Positive definiteness
- Positive-definite kernel
