= Discontinuity =

Discontinuity may refer to:

== Art ==
- Discontinuity (casting), an interruption in the normal physical structure or configuration of an article
- Discontinuity (fiction), in literature, a break in the consistency of a narrative

== Science and technology ==
- Discontinuity (geotechnical engineering), a plane or surface marking a change in physical or chemical properties in a soil or rock mass
- Discontinuity (linguistics), a property of tree structures in theoretical linguistics
- Discontinuity (mathematics), a property of a mathematical function
  - Classification of discontinuities
- Discontinuity (transmission lines), a step in impedance causing reflections
- Fracture (geology), a discontinuity in rocks

== Other uses ==
- Discontinuity (postmodernism), a conception of history by philosopher Michel Foucault
- Revolutionary breach of legal continuity

== See also ==
- Continuity (disambiguation)
