= Positive definiteness =

In mathematics, positive definiteness is a property of any object to which a bilinear form or a sesquilinear form may be naturally associated, which is positive-definite. See, in particular:

- Positive-definite bilinear form
- Positive-definite function
- Positive-definite function on a group
- Positive-definite functional
- Positive-definite kernel
- Positive-definite matrix
- Positive-definite operator
- Positive-definite quadratic form
