= Perfect measure =

In mathematics — specifically, in measure theory — a perfect measure (or, more accurately, a perfect measure space) is one that is "well-behaved" in some sense. Intuitively, a perfect measure μ is one for which, if we consider the pushforward measure on the real line R, then every measurable set is "μ-approximately a Borel set". The notion of perfectness is closely related to tightness of measures: indeed, in metric spaces, tight measures are always perfect.

== Definition ==
A measure space (X, Σ, μ) is said to be perfect if, for every Σ-measurable function f : X → R and every A ⊆ R with f^{−1}(A) ∈ Σ, there exist Borel subsets A_{1} and A_{2} of R such that

$$A_{1} \subseteq A \subseteq A_{2} \mbox{ and } \mu \big( f^{-1} ( A_{2} \setminus A_{1} ) \big) = 0.$$

== Results concerning perfect measures ==
- If X is any metric space and μ is an inner regular (or tight) measure on X, then (X, B_{X}, μ) is a perfect measure space, where B_{X} denotes the Borel σ-algebra on X.
