= Empirical characteristic function =

Let $(X_1,...,X_n)$ be independent, identically distributed real-valued random variables with common characteristic function $\varphi(t)$. The empirical characteristic function (ECF) defined as

$$\varphi_{n}(t)= \frac{1}{n} \sum_{j=1}^{n} e^{i tX_j},$$

is an unbiased and consistent estimator of the corresponding population characteristic function $\varphi(t)$, for each $t\in\mathbb R$.

== History ==
The ECF apparently made its debut in page 342 of the classical textbook of Cramér (1946), and then as part of the auxiliary tools for density estimation in Parzen (1962). Nearly a decade later the ECF features as the main object of research in two separate lines of application: In Press (1972) for parameter estimation and in Heathcote (1972) for goodness-of-fit testing.

Since that time there has subsequently been a vast expansion of statistical inference methods based on the ECF. For reviews of estimation methods based on the ECF the reader is referred to Csörgő (1984a), Rémillard and Theodorescu (2001), Yu (2004), and Carrasco and Kotchoni (2017), while testing procedures are surveyed by Csörgő (1984b), Hušková and Meintanis (2008a), Hušková and Meintanis (2008b), and Meintanis (2016). Ushakov (1999) and Prakasa Rao (1987) (chapter 8) are also good sources of information on the limit properties of the ECF process, as well as on estimation and goodness-of-fit testing via the ECF.

One of the lines of research that deserves special mention is ECF testing for independence by means of distance correlation as originally suggested by Székely et al. (2007). This approach has become extremely popular and is currently under vigorous development. We refer to Edelmann et al. (2019) and Székely and Rizzo (2023) for a recent survey on distance correlation methods.

Another popular line of research is goodness-of-fit testing for multivariate distributions, with special emphasis on testing for multivariate normality; for more information on this topic the reader is referred to the review by Ebner and Henze (2020). This approach of ECF-based goodness-of-fit testing has been generalized by Chen et al. (2022) to testing fit for arbitrary elliptical distributions by means of modification of the two-sample test initially suggested by Meintanis (2005).

A recent account of the basic ECF-based goodness-of-fit methods for testing symmetry, homogeneity and independence may be found in Chen et al. (2019).
