= Continuity =

Continuity or continuous may refer to:

== Mathematics ==
- Continuity (mathematics), the opposing concept to discreteness; common examples include
  - Continuous probability distribution or random variable in probability and statistics
  - Continuous game, a generalization of games used in game theory
  - Law of continuity, a heuristic principle of Gottfried Leibniz
  - Limit of a function which relies entirely on the concepts of continuity and discontinuity
- Continuous function, in particular:
  - Continuity (topology), a generalization to functions between topological spaces
  - Scott continuity, for functions between posets
  - Continuity (set theory), for functions between ordinals
  - Continuity (category theory), for functors
  - Graph continuity, for payoff functions in game theory
- Continuity theorem may refer to one of two results:
  - Lévy's continuity theorem, on random variables
  - Kolmogorov continuity theorem, on stochastic processes
- In geometry:
  - Parametric continuity, for parametrised curves
  - Geometric continuity, a concept primarily applied to the conic sections and related shapes
- In probability theory
  - Continuous stochastic process

== Science ==
- Continuity equations applicable to conservation of mass, energy, momentum, electric charge and other conserved quantities
- Continuity test for an unbroken electrical path in an electronic circuit or connector
- In materials science:
  - a colloidal system, consists of a dispersed phase evenly intermixed with a continuous phase
  - a continuous wave, an electromagnetic wave of constant amplitude and frequency

== Entertainment ==
- Continuity (broadcasting), messages played by broadcasters between programs
- Continuity editing, a form of film editing that combines closely related shots into a sequence highlighting plot points or consistencies
- Continuity (fiction), consistency of plot elements, such as characterization, location, and costuming, within a work of fiction (this is a mass noun)
- Continuity (setting), one of several similar but distinct fictional universes in a broad franchise of related works (this is a count noun)
- "Continuity" or continuity script, the precursor to a film screenplay

== Other uses ==
- Continuity (Apple), a set of features introduced by Apple
- Continuity of operations (disambiguation)
- Continuous and progressive aspects in linguistics
- Continuous (horse)
- Business continuity
- Health care continuity
- Continuous color scheme, for continuously coloring sortable data

== See also ==
- Continuum (disambiguation)
- Contiguity (disambiguation)
