= Bochner's theorem =

Theorem of Fourier transforms of Borel measures

In mathematics, Bochner's theorem (named for Salomon Bochner) characterizes the Fourier-Stieltjes transform of a positive finite Borel measure on the real line. More generally in harmonic analysis, Bochner's theorem asserts that under Fourier transform a continuous positive-definite function on a locally compact abelian group corresponds to a finite positive measure on the Pontryagin dual group. The case of sequences was first established by Gustav Herglotz

== The theorem for locally compact abelian groups ==
Bochner's theorem for a locally compact abelian group $G$, with dual group $\widehat{G}$, says the following:

Theorem For any normalized continuous positive-definite function $f : G \to \mathbb{C}$ (normalization here means that $f$ is 1 at the unit of $G$), there exists a unique probability measure $\mu$ on $\widehat{G}$ such that

$$f(g) = \int_{\widehat{G}} \xi(g) \,d\mu(\xi),$$

i.e. $f$ is the Fourier transform of a unique probability measure $\mu$ on $\widehat{G}$. Conversely, the Fourier transform of a probability measure on $\widehat{G}$ is necessarily a normalized continuous positive-definite function $f$ on $G$. This is in fact a one-to-one correspondence.

The Gelfand–Fourier transform is an isomorphism between the group C*-algebra $C^*(G)$ and $C_0(\widehat{G})$. The theorem is essentially the dual statement for states of the two abelian C*-algebras.

The proof of the theorem passes through vector states on strongly continuous unitary representations of $G$ (the proof in fact shows that every normalized continuous positive-definite function must be of this form).

Given a normalized continuous positive-definite function $f$ on $G$, one can construct a strongly continuous unitary representation of $G$ in a natural way: Let $F_0(G)$ be the family of complex-valued functions on $G$ with finite support, i.e. $h(g) = 0$ for all but finitely many $g$. The positive-definite kernel $K(g_1, g_2) = f(g_1 - g_2)$ induces a (possibly degenerate) inner product on $F_0(G)$. Quotienting out degeneracy and taking the completion gives a Hilbert space

$$(\mathcal{H}, \langle \cdot, \cdot\rangle_f),$$

whose typical element is an equivalence class $[h]$. For a fixed $g$ in $G$, the "shift operator" $U_g$ defined by $(U_g h) (g') = h(g' - g)$, for a representative of $[h]$, is unitary. So the map

$$g \mapsto U_g$$

is a unitary representations of $G$ on $(\mathcal{H}, \langle \cdot, \cdot\rangle_f)$. By continuity of $f$, it is weakly continuous, therefore strongly continuous. By construction, we have

$$\langle U_g [e], [e] \rangle_f = f(g),$$

where $[e]$ is the class of the function that is 1 on the identity of $G$ and zero elsewhere. But by Gelfand–Fourier isomorphism, the vector state $\langle \cdot [e], [e] \rangle_f$ on $C^*(G)$ is the pullback of a state on $C_0(\widehat{G})$, which is necessarily integration against a probability measure $\mu$. Chasing through the isomorphisms then gives

$$\langle U_g [e], [e] \rangle_f = \int_{\widehat{G}} \xi(g) \,d\mu(\xi).$$

On the other hand, given a probability measure $\mu$ on $\widehat{G}$, the function

$$f(g) = \int_{\widehat{G}} \xi(g) \,d\mu(\xi)$$

is a normalized continuous positive-definite function. Continuity of $f$ follows from the dominated convergence theorem. For positive-definiteness, take a nondegenerate representation of $C_0(\widehat{G})$. This extends uniquely to a representation of its multiplier algebra $C_b(\widehat{G})$ and therefore a strongly continuous unitary representation $U_g$. As above we have $f$ given by some vector state on $U_g$

$$f(g) = \langle U_g v, v \rangle,$$

therefore positive-definite.

The two constructions are mutual inverses.

== Special cases ==
Bochner's theorem in the special case of the discrete group $\mathbb{Z}$ is often referred to as Herglotz's theorem and says that a function $f$ on $\mathbb{Z}$ with $f(0) = 1$ is positive-definite if and only if there exists a probability measure $\mu$ on the circle $\mathbb{T}$ such that
$$f(k) = \int_{\mathbb{T}} e^{-2 \pi i k x} \,d\mu(x),$$
are the coefficients of a Fourier-Stieltjes series.

Similarly, a continuous function $f : \mathbb{R}^d \to \mathbb{C}$ with $f(0) = 1$ is positive-definite if and only if there exists a probability measure $\mu$ on $\mathbb{R}^d$ such that

$$f(t) = \int_{\mathbb{R}^d} e^{-2 \pi i \xi \cdot t} \,d\mu(\xi).$$

Here, $f$ is positive definite if for any finite set of points $\alpha_1, \cdots, \alpha_N \in \mathbb{R}^d$, and any complex numbers $\rho_1, \cdots, \rho_N \in \mathbb{C}$, there holds

$$\sum_{p,q = 1}^N f(\alpha_p - \alpha_q) \rho_p \bar{\rho}_q \geqslant 0.$$

== Applications ==
In statistics, Bochner's theorem can be used to describe the serial correlation of certain type of time series. A sequence of random variables $\{f_n\}$ of mean 0 is a (wide-sense) stationary time series if the covariance

$$\operatorname{Cov}(f_n, f_m)$$

only depends on $n - m$. The function

$$g(n - m) = \operatorname{Cov}(f_n, f_m)$$

is called the autocovariance function of the time series. By the mean zero assumption,

$$g(n - m) = \langle f_n, f_m \rangle,$$

where $\langle\cdot, \cdot\rangle$ denotes the inner product on the Hilbert space of random variables with finite second moments. It is then immediate that $g$ is a positive-definite function on the integers $\mathbb{Z}$. By Bochner's theorem, there exists a unique positive measure $\mu$ on $[0, 1]$ such that

$$g(k) = \int e^{-2 \pi i k x} \,d\mu(x).$$

This measure $\mu$ is called the spectral measure of the time series. It yields information about the "seasonal trends" of the series.

For example, let $z$ be an $m$-th root of unity (with the current identification, this is $1/m \in [0, 1]$) and $f$ be a random variable of mean 0 and variance 1. Consider the time series $\{z^n f\}$. The autocovariance function is

$$g(k) = z^k.$$

Evidently, the corresponding spectral measure is the Dirac point mass centered at $z$. This is related to the fact that the time series repeats itself every $m$ periods.

When $g$ has sufficiently fast decay, the measure $\mu$ is absolutely continuous with respect to the Lebesgue measure, and its Radon–Nikodym derivative $f$ is called the spectral density of the time series. When $g$ lies in $\ell^1(\mathbb{Z})$, $f$ is the Fourier transform of $g$.

== See also ==
- Bochner-Minlos theorem
- Characteristic function (probability theory)
- Positive-definite function on a group
- Riesz–Markov–Kakutani representation theorem
