= Subindependence =

In probability theory and statistics, subindependence is a weak form of independence.

Two random variables X and Y are said to be subindependent if the characteristic function of their sum is equal to the product of their marginal characteristic functions. Symbolically:

$$\varphi_{X+Y}(t) = \varphi_X(t)\cdot\varphi_Y(t).$$

This is a weakening of the concept of independence of random variables, i.e. if two random variables are independent then they are subindependent, but not conversely. If two random variables are subindependent, and if their covariance exists, then they are uncorrelated.

Subindependence has some peculiar properties: for example, there exist random variables X and Y that are subindependent, but X and αY are not subindependent when α ≠ 1 and therefore X and Y are not independent.

One instance of subindependence is when a random variable X is Cauchy with location 0 and scale s and another random variable Y=X, the antithesis of independence. Then X+Y is also Cauchy but with scale 2s. The characteristic function of either X or Y in t is then exp(-s·|t|), and the characteristic function of X+Y is exp(-2s·|t|) = exp(-s·|t|)^{2}.
