= Prokhorov's theorem =

Theorem in measure theory

In measure theory Prokhorov's theorem relates tightness of measures to relative compactness (and hence weak convergence) in the space of probability measures. It is credited to the Soviet mathematician Yuri Vasilyevich Prokhorov, who considered probability measures on complete separable metric spaces. The term "Prokhorov’s theorem" is also applied to later generalizations to either the direct or the inverse statements.

== Statement ==
Let $(S, \rho)$ be a separable metric space. Let $\mathcal{P}(S)$ denote the collection of all probability measures defined on $S$ (with its Borel σ-algebra).

Theorem.

1. If a collection $K\subset \mathcal{P}(S)$ of probability measures is tight, then the closure of $K$ is sequentially compact in the space $\mathcal{P}(S)$ equipped with the topology of weak convergence.
2. The space $\mathcal{P}(S)$ with the topology of weak convergence is metrizable.
3. Suppose that in addition, $(S,\rho)$ is a complete metric space (so that $(S,\rho)$ is a Polish space). Then the converse of (1) also holds; hence $K\subset \mathcal{P}(S)$ is tight if and only if its closure is sequentially compact. Moreover, there exists a complete metric $d_0$ on $\mathcal{P}(S)$ equivalent to the topology of weak convergence, and for this metric $K\subset \mathcal{P}(S)$ is tight if and only if its closure in $(\mathcal{P}(S),d_0)$ is compact.

== Corollaries ==
For Euclidean spaces we have that:

- If $(\mu_n)$ is a tight sequence in $\mathcal{P}(\mathbb{R}^m)$ (the collection of probability measures on $m$-dimensional Euclidean space), then there exist a subsequence $(\mu_{n_k})$ and a probability measure $\mu\in\mathcal{P}(\mathbb{R}^m)$ such that $\mu_{n_k}$ converges weakly to $\mu$.
- If $(\mu_n)$ is a tight sequence in $\mathcal{P}(\mathbb{R}^m)$ such that every weakly convergent subsequence $(\mu_{n_k})$ has the same limit $\mu\in\mathcal{P}(\mathbb{R}^m)$, then the sequence $(\mu_n)$ converges weakly to $\mu$.

== Extension ==
Prokhorov's theorem can be extended to consider complex measures or finite signed measures.

Theorem: Suppose that $(S,\rho)$ is a complete separable metric space and $\Pi$ is a family of Borel complex measures on $S$. The following statements are equivalent:

- $\Pi$ is sequentially precompact; that is, every sequence $\{\mu_n\}\subset\Pi$ has a weakly convergent subsequence.
- $\Pi$ is tight and uniformly bounded in total variation norm.

== Comments ==
Since Prokhorov's theorem expresses tightness in terms of compactness, the Arzelà–Ascoli theorem is often used to substitute for compactness: in function spaces, this leads to a characterization of tightness in terms of the modulus of continuity or an appropriate analogue—see tightness in classical Wiener space and tightness in Skorokhod space.

There are several deep and non-trivial extensions to Prokhorov's theorem. However, those results do not overshadow the importance and the relevance to applications of the original result.

== See also ==
- Lévy–Prokhorov metric – Probability metric in mathematics
- Sazonov's theorem
- Tightness of measures – Concept in measure theory
- Weak convergence of measures – Mathematical concept
