= Lévy metric =

Metric used in mathematics

In mathematics, the Lévy metric is a metric on the space of cumulative distribution functions of one-dimensional random variables. It is a special case of the Lévy–Prokhorov metric, and is named after the French mathematician Paul Lévy.

== Definition ==
Let $F, G : \mathbb{R} \to [0, 1]$ be two cumulative distribution functions. Define the Lévy distance between them to be

$$L(F, G) := \inf \{ \varepsilon > 0 \mid F(x - \varepsilon) - \varepsilon \leq G(x) \leq F(x + \varepsilon) + \varepsilon,\; \forall x \in \mathbb{R} \}.$$

Intuitively, if between the graphs of F and G one inscribes squares with sides parallel to the coordinate axes (at points of discontinuity of a graph vertical segments are added), then the side-length of the largest such square is equal to L(F, G).

A sequence of cumulative distribution functions $\{F_n \}_{n=1}^\infty$ weakly converges to another cumulative distribution function $F$ if and only if $L(F_n,F) \to 0$.

== See also ==
- Càdlàg
- Lévy–Prokhorov metric
- Wasserstein metric
