= Smoothness (probability theory) =

In probability theory and statistics, smoothness of a density function is a measure which determines how many times the density function can be differentiated, or equivalently the limiting behavior of distribution’s characteristic function.

Formally, we call the distribution of a random variable X ordinary smooth of order β if its characteristic function satisfies

$$d_0 |t|^{-\beta} \leq |\varphi_X(t)| \leq d_1 |t|^{-\beta} \quad \text{as } t\to\infty$$

for some positive constants d_{0}, d_{1}, β. The examples of such distributions are gamma, exponential, uniform, etc.

The distribution is called supersmooth of order β if its characteristic function satisfies

$$d_0 |t|^{\beta_0}\exp\big(-|t|^\beta/\gamma\big) \leq |\varphi_X(t)| \leq d_1 |t|^{\beta_1}\exp\big(-|t|^\beta/\gamma\big) \quad \text{as } t\to\infty$$

for some positive constants d_{0}, d_{1}, β, γ and constants β_{0}, β_{1}. Such supersmooth distributions have derivatives of all orders. Examples: normal, Cauchy, mixture normal.
