= List of canceled Command & Conquer games =

Over the years, several video games in the Command & Conquer franchise began development, but were eventually canceled. Command & Conquer: Renegade 2 and Command & Conquer: Continuum were both in development by Westwood Studios before being canceled due to Electronic Arts' closure of Westwood Studios in 2003. Tiberian Incursion, the sequel to Tiberian Sun, was also in early stages of development, but was put on hold until some of its concepts were reused in Tiberium Wars. Tiberium was being developed by EA Los Angeles before it was canceled due to quality concerns.

== Command & Conquer: Renegade 2 ==
Command & Conquer: Renegade 2
- Developer: Westwood Studios
- Engine: Westwood 3D
- Platform: Microsoft Windows
- Release: Canceled
- Genres: First-person shooter, Tactical shooter
- Modes: Single-player, Multiplayer

Command & Conquer: Renegade 2 was to be another first-person shooter game using an updated version of the "Westwood 3D" engine, used in Command & Conquer: Renegade. Renegade 2 had two build versions: The first version of Renegade 2 was drafted as a connection to Command & Conquer from Red Alert 2. However, this was scrapped in favour of a Red Alert 2 based FPS that took place in the post Yuri's Revenge world. The storyline was about a rogue Soviet commander attacking America to avenge the honour of Premier Romanov (the commander was a Romanov). Most units designed were based on Red Alert 2 styles, but the Allied Light Tank and Soviet Hind Gunship were included, units which only appeared in Red Alert.

== Command & Conquer: Continuum ==
Command & Conquer: Continuum
- Developer: Westwood Studios
- Engine: Westwood 3D
- Platform: Microsoft Windows
- Release: Canceled
- Genre: Massively multiplayer online role-playing game
- Mode: Multiplayer

Command & Conquer: Continuum was to be Westwood's second MMORPG, after Earth & Beyond. It was developed on the "Westwood 3D" engine. It was canceled due to the termination of Westwood Studios in 2003. It was to feature a moving and evolving Tiberian world, where the players could play a great role in the entire story. The GDI, Nod, Mutants and CABAL were to be major factions with the Scrin to be added later. Prominent locations included a half submerged Los Angeles, Area 51, Dino island, Newark airport, a mutant city, and other locations.

Adam 'Ishmael' Isgreen and Rade Stojsavljevic stated that it was to be a non-stand-and-swing MMORPG, featuring instanced "crisis zones" in it, hubbed flight routes, and scripted boss battles. These have appeared in other MMORPGs since. Rather than static combat found in many MMORPGs, fluid and movement-oriented combat was to be implemented with range being an important factor for weapons use, and multiple layers of counters for the weapon types. Creatures were to be similar to bosses in console games in that the players could expose weaknesses on them and then hit those for extra damage.

== Command & Conquer: Tiberian Incursion ==
Command & Conquer: Tiberian Incursion
- Screenshot from an early development version of Tiberian Incursion
- Developer: Westwood Studios
- Engine: SAGE
- Platform: Microsoft Windows
- Release: Canceled
- Genre: Real-time strategy
- Modes: Single-player, Multiplayer

Tiberian Incursion was the working title for what was to be Westwood's third "Tiberium" game (sometimes referred to as Tiberian Twilight by fans), which was going to feature the arrival of the Scrin. An event planned for the game was the creation of Red Alert 2's universe due to the use of time travel, but this was rejected. Some elements of the canceled game were included in Tiberium Wars.

== Tiberium ==
Tiberium
- Developer: EA Los Angeles
- Publisher: Electronic Arts
- Engine: Unreal Engine 3-based
- Platforms: PlayStation 3, Microsoft Windows, Xbox 360
- Release: Canceled
- Genres: First-person shooter, Tactical shooter
- Modes: Single-player, Multiplayer

Tiberium was to be a tactical first-person shooter video game title set in the Command & Conquer universe, that was in development by EA Los Angeles. Tiberium was initially revealed when shots of the January 2008 issue of Game Informer were leaked, but was officially announced by EA just a day after. Prior to the announcement, the game had been in production for two years.

The plot would have revolved around a repeat invasion of Scrin, shown from the eyes of a GDI commando.

In the first previews of the game by GameSpot and IGN, it was confirmed Tiberium used a game engine based on Unreal Engine 3.

Tiberium was canceled on September 30, 2008 due to the game's failure to meet "quality standards set by the development team and the EA Games label". Mariam Sughayer, EA spokesperson, said that "EA has suspended work on Tiberium effective immediately. The game was not on track to meet the high quality standards set by the team and by the EA Games Label. A lower quality game is not in the best interest of the consumers and would not succeed in this market".

== Project Camacho ==
Project Camacho was planned as a real-time strategy/first-person shooter hybrid set in the Command & Conquer: Generals universe, but it was cancelled in 2008.

== Command & Conquer: Arena ==
Command & Conquer: Arena was planned as a multiplayer-oriented spin-off of Tiberium Wars and Kane's Wrath, set in the Tiberium universe. The game featured the tagline: "The war is over, but the battle continues". The storyline followed the ascension of Kane, and involved a subsequent Scrin invasion and enslavement of Earth.

== Command & Conquer (2013) ==
Command & Conquer
- Developer: Victory Games
- Publisher: Electronic Arts
- Engine: Frostbite 3
- Platform: Microsoft Windows
- Release: Canceled
- Genre: Real-time strategy
- Modes: Single-player, multi-player

Command & Conquer (previously known as Command & Conquer: Generals 2) was to be a real-time strategy video game in the Command & Conquer series, developed by Victory Games for Microsoft Windows. The game would use Frostbite 3 engine and would introduce downloadable content to the franchise. It was supposed to be the first game in the series to be developed by Victory Games, making them the series' third developer after Westwood Studios and EA Los Angeles. Command & Conquer would be exclusively available on Origin, the distribution service of Electronic Arts.

The game was announced as a direct sequel to Command & Conquer: Generals but was re-purposed as the first in a series of free-to-play games set in the Command & Conquer universe. The skirmish multiplayer platform was slated for release for free around Christmas 2013, with pay per play campaign missions releasing by Q1 2014. However, on October 29, EA ceased development of the title, reportedly because of the negative feedback during the closed alpha testing stage. Two days later, Victory Games was shut down altogether.
