= Lévy's continuity theorem =

Result in probability theory

In probability theory, Lévy’s continuity theorem, or Lévy's convergence theorem, named after the French mathematician Paul Lévy, connects convergence in distribution of the sequence of random variables with pointwise convergence of their characteristic functions. This theorem is the basis for one approach to prove the central limit theorem and is one of the major theorems concerning characteristic functions.

== Statement ==
Suppose we have

- a sequence of random variables $\{X_n\}_{n=1}^\infty$, not necessarily sharing a common probability space,
- the sequence of corresponding characteristic functions $\{\varphi_n\}_{n=1}^\infty$, which by definition are
  $$\varphi_n(t) = \operatorname{E} \left[ e^{itX_n} \right] \quad \forall t\in\mathbb{R},\ \forall n\in\mathbb{N},$$
  where $\operatorname{E}$ is the expected value operator.

If the sequence of characteristic functions converges pointwise to some function $\varphi$

$$\varphi_n(t)\to\varphi(t) \quad \forall t\in\mathbb{R},$$

then the following statements become equivalent:

- $X_n$ converges in distribution to some random variable X
  $$X_n\ \xrightarrow{\mathcal D}\ X,$$
  i.e. the cumulative distribution functions corresponding to random variables converge at every continuity point of the c.d.f. of X;
- $\{X_n\}_{n=1}^\infty$ is tight:
  $$\lim_{x\to\infty}\left( \sup_n \operatorname{P}\big[\, |X_n|>x \,\big]\right) = 0;$$
- $\varphi(t)$ is a characteristic function of some random variable X;
- $\varphi(t)$ is a continuous function of t;
- $\varphi(t)$ is continuous at t = 0.

== Proof ==
Rigorous proofs of this theorem are available.
