= Lévy–Prokhorov metric =

Probability metric in mathematics

In mathematics, the Lévy–Prokhorov metric (sometimes known just as the Prokhorov metric) is a metric (i.e., a definition of distance) on the collection of probability measures on a given metric space. It is named after the French mathematician Paul Lévy and the Soviet mathematician Yuri Vasilyevich Prokhorov; Prokhorov introduced it in 1956 as a generalization of the earlier Lévy metric.

== Definition ==
Let $(M, d)$ be a metric space with its Borel sigma algebra $\mathcal{B} (M)$. Let $\mathcal{P} (M)$ denote the collection of all probability measures on the measurable space $(M, \mathcal{B} (M))$.

For a subset $A \subseteq M$, define the ε-neighborhood of $A$ by

$$A^{\varepsilon} := \{ p \in M ~|~ \exists q \in A, \ d(p, q) < \varepsilon \} = \bigcup_{p \in A} B_{\varepsilon} (p).$$

where $B_{\varepsilon} (p)$ is the open ball of radius $\varepsilon$ centered at $p$.

The Lévy–Prokhorov metric $\pi : \mathcal{P} (M)^{2} \to [0, + \infty)$ is defined by setting the distance between two probability measures $\mu$ and $\nu$ to be

$$\pi (\mu, \nu) := \inf \left\{ \varepsilon > 0 ~|~ \mu(A) \leq \nu (A^{\varepsilon}) + \varepsilon \ \text{and} \ \nu (A) \leq \mu (A^{\varepsilon}) + \varepsilon \ \text{for all} \ A \in \mathcal{B}(M) \right\}.$$

For probability measures clearly $\pi (\mu, \nu) \le 1$.

Some authors omit one of the two inequalities or choose only open or closed $A$; either inequality implies the other, and $(\bar{A})^\varepsilon = A^\varepsilon$, but restricting to open sets may change the metric so defined (if $M$ is not Polish).

== Properties ==
- If $(M, d)$ is separable, convergence of measures in the Lévy–Prokhorov metric is equivalent to weak convergence of measures. Thus, $\pi$ is a metrization of the topology of weak convergence on $\mathcal{P} (M)$.
- The metric space $\left( \mathcal{P} (M), \pi \right)$ is separable if and only if $(M, d)$ is separable.
- If $\left( \mathcal{P} (M), \pi \right)$ is complete then $(M, d)$ is complete. If all the measures in $\mathcal{P} (M)$ have separable support, then the converse implication also holds: if $(M, d)$ is complete then $\left( \mathcal{P} (M), \pi \right)$ is complete. In particular, this is the case if $(M, d)$ is separable.
- If $(M, d)$ is separable and complete, a subset $\mathcal{K} \subseteq \mathcal{P} (M)$ is relatively compact if and only if its $\pi$-closure is $\pi$-compact.
- If $(M,d)$ is separable, then $\pi (\mu , \nu ) = \inf \{ \alpha (X,Y) : \text{Law}(X) = \mu , \text{Law}(Y) = \nu \}$, where $\alpha (X,Y) = \inf\{ \varepsilon > 0 : \mathbb{P} ( d( X ,Y ) > \varepsilon ) \leq \varepsilon \}$ is the Ky Fan metric.

== Relation to other distances ==
Let $(M,d)$ be separable. Then

- $\pi (\mu , \nu ) \leq \delta (\mu , \nu)$, where $\delta (\mu,\nu)$ is the total variation distance of probability measures
- $\pi (\mu , \nu)^2 \leq W_p (\mu, \nu)^p$, where $W_p$ is the Wasserstein metric with $p\geq 1$ and $\mu, \nu$ have finite $p$th moment.

== See also ==
- Lévy metric
- Prokhorov's theorem
- Tightness of measures
- Weak convergence of measures
- Wasserstein metric
- Radon distance
- Total variation distance of probability measures
