= Continuity of operations =

Continuity of operations can mean:

- Continuity of government, defined procedures that allow a government to continue its essential operations in case of a catastrophic event
  - Continuity of Government Commission, a nonpartisan think tank established in 2002 in the United States
  - United States federal government continuity of operations
