= Positive-definite function on a group =

In mathematics, and specifically in operator theory, a positive-definite function on a group relates the notions of positivity, in the context of Hilbert spaces, and algebraic groups. It can be viewed as a particular type of positive-definite kernel where the underlying set has the additional group structure.

== Definition ==
Let $G$ be a group, $H$ be a complex Hilbert space, and $L(H)$ be the bounded operators on $H$. A positive-definite function on $G$ is a function $F: G \to L(H)$ that satisfies

$$\sum_{s,t \in G}\langle F(s^{-1}t) h(t), h(s) \rangle \geq 0 ,$$

for every function $h: G \to H$ with finite support ($h$ takes non-zero values for only finitely many $s$).

In other words, a function $F: G \to L(H)$ is said to be a positive-definite function if the kernel $K: G \times G \to L(H)$ defined by $K(s, t) = F(s^{-1}t)$ is a positive-definite kernel. Such a kernel is $G$-symmetric, that is, it invariant under left $G$-action:
$$K(s, t) = K(rs, rt) , \quad \forall r \in G$$
When $G$ is a locally compact group, the definition generalizes by integration over its left-invariant Haar measure $\mu$. A positive-definite function on $G$ is a continuous function $F: G \to L(H)$ that satisfies
$$\int_{s,t \in G}\langle F(s^{-1}t) h(t), h(s) \rangle \; \mu(ds) \mu(dt) \geq 0 ,$$
for every continuous function $h: G \to H$ with compact support.

=== Examples ===
The constant function $F(g) = I$, where $I$ is the identity operator on $H$, is positive-definite.

Let $G$ be a finite abelian group and $H$ be the one-dimensional Hilbert space $\mathbb{C}$. Any character $\chi: G \to \mathbb{C}$ is positive-definite. (This is a special case of unitary representation.)

To show this, recall that a character of a finite group $G$ is a homomorphism from $G$ to the multiplicative group of norm-1 complex numbers. Then, for any function $h: G \to \mathbb{C}$,
$$\sum_{s,t \in G}\chi(s^{-1}t)h(t)\overline{h(s)} = \sum_{s,t \in G}\chi(s^{-1})h(t)\chi(t)\overline{h(s)}
= \sum_{s}\chi(s^{-1})\overline{h(s)}\sum_{t}h(t)\chi(t) = \left|\sum_{t}h(t)\chi(t)\right|^2 \geq 0.$$
When $G = \R^n$ with the Lebesgue measure, and $H = \C^m$, a positive-definite function on $G$ is a continuous function $F : \R^n \to \C^{m\times m}$ such that
$$\int_{x, y \in \R^n} h(x)^\dagger F(x-y) h(y)\; dxdy \geq 0$$
for every continuous function $h: \R^n \to \C^m$ with compact support.

== Unitary representations ==
A unitary representation is a unital homomorphism $\Phi: G \to L(H)$ where $\Phi(s)$ is a unitary operator for all $s$. For such $\Phi$, $\Phi(s^{-1}) = \Phi(s)^*$.

Positive-definite functions on $G$ are intimately related to unitary representations of $G$. Every unitary representation of $G$ gives rise to a family of positive-definite functions. Conversely, given a positive-definite function, one can define a unitary representation of $G$ in a natural way.

Let $\Phi: G \to L(H)$ be a unitary representation of $G$. If $P \in L(H)$ is the projection onto a closed subspace $H'$ of $H$. Then $F(s) = P \Phi(s)$ is a positive-definite function on $G$ with values in $L(H')$. This can be shown readily:

$$\begin{align}
\sum_{s,t \in G}\langle F(s^{-1}t) h(t), h(s) \rangle
& =\sum_{s,t \in G}\langle P \Phi (s^{-1}t) h(t), h(s) \rangle \\
{} & =\sum_{s,t \in G}\langle \Phi (t) h(t), \Phi(s)h(s) \rangle \\
{} & = \left\langle \sum_{t \in G} \Phi (t) h(t), \sum_{s \in G} \Phi(s)h(s) \right\rangle \\
{} & \geq 0
\end{align}$$

for every $h: G \to H'$ with finite support. If $G$ has a topology and $\Phi$ is weakly(resp. strongly) continuous, then clearly so is $F$.

On the other hand, consider now a positive-definite function $F$ on $G$. A unitary representation of $G$ can be obtained as follows. Let $C_{00}(G, H)$ be the family of functions $h: G \to H$ with finite support. The corresponding positive kernel $K(s, t) = F(s^{-1}t)$ defines a (possibly degenerate) inner product on $C_{00}(G, H)$. Let the resulting Hilbert space be denoted by $V$.

We notice that the "matrix elements" $K(s, t) = K(a^{-1}s, a^{-1}t)$ for all $a, s, t$ in $G$. So $U_ah(s) = h(a^{-1}s)$ preserves the inner product on $V$, i.e. it is unitary in $L(V)$. It is clear that the map $\Phi(a) = U_a$ is a representation of $G$ on $V$.

The unitary representation is unique, up to Hilbert space isomorphism, provided the following minimality condition holds:

$$V = \bigvee_{s \in G} \Phi(s)H$$

where $\bigvee$ denotes the closure of the linear span.

Identify $H$ as elements (possibly equivalence classes) in $V$, whose support consists of the identity element $e \in G$, and let $P$ be the projection onto this subspace. Then we have $PU_aP = F(a)$ for all $a \in G$.

== Toeplitz kernels ==
Let $G$ be the additive group of integers $\mathbb{Z}$. The kernel $K(n, m) = F(m - n)$ is called a kernel of Toeplitz type, by analogy with Toeplitz matrices. If $F$ is of the form $F(n) = T^n$ where $T$ is a bounded operator acting on some Hilbert space, one can show that the kernel $K(n, m)$ is positive if and only if $T$ is a contraction. By the discussion from the previous section, we have a unitary representation of $\mathbb{Z}$, $\Phi(n) = U^n$ for a unitary operator $U$. Moreover, the property $PU_aP = F(a)$ now translates to $PU^nP = T^n$. This is precisely Sz.-Nagy's dilation theorem and hints at an important dilation-theoretic characterization of positivity that leads to a parametrization of arbitrary positive-definite kernels.
