= Tightness of measures =

Concept in measure theory

In mathematics, tightness is a concept in measure theory. The intuitive idea is that a given collection of measures does not "escape to infinity".

== Definitions ==
Let $(X, T)$ be a Hausdorff space, and let $\Sigma$ be a σ-algebra on $X$ that contains the topology $T$. (Thus, every open subset of $X$ is a measurable set and $\Sigma$ is at least as fine as the Borel σ-algebra on $X$.) Let $M$ be a collection of (possibly signed or complex) measures defined on $\Sigma$. The collection $M$ is called tight (or sometimes uniformly tight) if, for any $\varepsilon > 0$, there is a compact subset $K_{\varepsilon}$ of $X$ such that, for all measures $\mu \in M$,

$$|\mu| (X \setminus K_{\varepsilon}) < \varepsilon.$$

where $|\mu|$ is the total variation measure of $\mu$. Very often, the measures in question are probability measures, so the last part can be written as

$$\mu (K_{\varepsilon}) > 1 - \varepsilon. \,$$

If a tight collection $M$ consists of a single measure $\mu$, then (depending upon the author) $\mu$ may either be said to be a tight measure or to be an inner regular measure.

If $Y$ is an $X$-valued random variable whose probability distribution on $X$ is a tight measure then $Y$ is said to be a separable random variable or a Radon random variable.

Another equivalent criterion of the tightness of a collection $M$ is sequential weak compactness. We say the family $M$ of probability measures is sequentially weakly compact if for every sequence $\left\{\mu_n\right\}$ from the family, there is a subsequence of measures that converges weakly to some probability measure $\mu$. It can be shown that a family of measures is tight if and only if it is sequentially weakly compact.

== Examples ==
=== Compact spaces ===
If $X$ is a metrizable compact space, then every collection of (possibly complex) measures on $X$ is tight. This is not necessarily so for non-metrisable compact spaces. If we take $[0,\omega_1]$ with its order topology, then there exists a measure $\mu$ on it that is not inner regular. Therefore, the singleton $\{\mu\}$ is not tight.

=== Polish spaces ===
If $X$ is a Polish space, then every finite measure on $X$ is tight; this is Ulam's theorem. Furthermore, by Prokhorov's theorem, a collection of probability measures on $X$ is tight if and only if it is precompact in the topology of weak convergence.

=== A collection of point masses ===
Consider the real line $\mathbb{R}$ with its usual Borel topology. Let $\delta_{x}$ denote the Dirac measure, a unit mass at the point $x$ in $\mathbb{R}$. The collection
$$M_{1} := \{ \delta_{n} \mid n \in \mathbb{N} \}$$
is not tight, since the compact subsets of $\mathbb{R}$ are precisely the closed and bounded subsets, and any such set, since it is bounded, has $\delta_{n}$-measure zero for large enough $n$. On the other hand, the collection
$$M_{2} := \{ \delta_{1 / n} \mid n \in \mathbb{N} \}$$
is tight: the compact interval $[0, 1]$ will work as $K_{\varepsilon}$ for any $\varepsilon > 0$. In general, a collection of Dirac delta measures on $\mathbb{R}^{n}$ is tight if, and only if, the collection of their supports is bounded.

=== A collection of Gaussian measures ===
Consider $n$-dimensional Euclidean space $\mathbb{R}^{n}$ with its usual Borel topology and σ-algebra. Consider a collection of Gaussian measures
$$\Gamma = \{ \gamma_{i} \mid i \in I \},$$
where the measure $\gamma_{i}$ has expected value (mean) $m_{i} \in \mathbb{R}^{n}$ and covariance matrix $C_{i} \in \mathbb{R}^{n \times n}$. Then the collection $\Gamma$ is tight if, and only if, the collections $\{ m_{i} \mid i \in I \} \subseteq \mathbb{R}^{n}$ and $\{ C_{i} \mid i \in I \} \subseteq \mathbb{R}^{n \times n}$ are both bounded.

== Tightness and convergence ==
Tightness is often a necessary criterion for proving the weak convergence of a sequence of probability measures, especially when the measure space has infinite dimension. See

- Finite-dimensional distribution
- Prokhorov's theorem
- Lévy–Prokhorov metric
- Weak convergence of measures
- Tightness in classical Wiener space
- Tightness in Skorokhod space

== Tightness and stochastic ordering ==
A family of real-valued random variables $\{X_i\}_{i \in I}$ is tight if and only if there exists an almost surely finite random variable $X$ such that $|X_i| \le_\mathrm{st} X$ for all $i \in I$, where $\le_\mathrm{st}$ denotes the stochastic order defined by $A \le_\mathrm{st} B$ if $\mathbb{E}[ \phi(A)] \le \mathbb{E}[ \phi(B)]$ for all nondecreasing functions $\phi$.

== Exponential tightness ==
A strengthening of tightness is the concept of exponential tightness, which has applications in large deviations theory. A family of probability measures $(\mu_{\delta})_{\delta > 0}$ on a Hausdorff topological space $X$ is said to be exponentially tight if, for any $\varepsilon > 0$, there is a compact subset $K_{\varepsilon}$ of $X$ such that

$$\limsup_{\delta \downarrow 0} \delta \log \mu_{\delta} (X \setminus K_{\varepsilon}) < - \varepsilon.$$
