= Continuity set =

In measure theory, a branch of mathematics, a continuity set of a measure μ is any Borel set B such that $\mu(\partial B) = 0,$ where $\partial B$ is the (topological) boundary of B. For signed measures, one instead asks that $|\mu|(\partial B) = 0.$

The collection of all continuity sets for a given measure μ forms a ring of sets.

Similarly, for a random variable X, a set B is called a continuity set of X if $\Pr[X \in \partial B] = 0.$

== Continuity set of a function ==
The continuity set C(f) of a function f is the set of points where f is continuous.
