= Random element =

In probability theory, random element is a generalization of the concept of random variable to more complicated spaces than the simple real line. The concept was introduced by Maurice Fréchet (1948) who commented:

[the] development of probability theory and expansion of area of its applications have led to necessity to pass from schemes where (random) outcomes of experiments can be described by number or a finite set of numbers, to schemes where outcomes of experiments represent, for example, vectors, functions, processes, fields, series, transformations, and also sets or collections of sets.

The modern-day usage of “random element” frequently assumes the space of values is a topological vector space, often a Banach or Hilbert space with a specified natural sigma algebra of subsets.

== Definition ==
Let $(\Omega, \mathcal{F}, P)$ be a probability space, and $(E, \mathcal{E})$ a measurable space. A random element with values in E is a function X: Ω→E which is $(\mathcal{F}, \mathcal{E})$-measurable. That is, a function X such that for any $B\in \mathcal{E}$, the preimage of B lies in $\mathcal{F}$.

Sometimes random elements with values in $E$ are called $E$-valued random variables.

Note if $(E, \mathcal{E})=(\mathbb{R}, \mathcal{B}(\mathbb{R}))$, where $\mathbb{R}$ are the real numbers, and $\mathcal{B}(\mathbb{R})$ is its Borel σ-algebra, then the definition of random element is the classical definition of random variable.

The definition of a random element $X$ with values in a Banach space $B$ is typically understood to utilize the smallest $\sigma$-algebra on B for which every bounded linear functional is measurable. An equivalent definition, in this case, to the above, is that a map $X: \Omega \rightarrow B$, from a probability space, is a random element if $f \circ X$ is a random variable for every bounded linear functional f, or, equivalently, that $X$ is weakly measurable.

== Examples of random elements ==
=== Random variable ===
A random variable is the simplest type of random element. It is a map $X\colon \Omega \to \mathbb{R}$ is a measurable function from the set of possible outcomes $\Omega$ to $\mathbb{R}$.

As a real-valued function, $X$ often describes some numerical quantity of a given event. E.g. the number of heads after a certain number of coin flips; the heights of different people.

When the image (or range) of $X$ is finite or countably infinite, the random variable is called a discrete random variable and its distribution can be described by a probability mass function which assigns a probability to each value in the image of $X$. If the image is uncountably infinite then $X$ is called a continuous random variable. In the special case that it is absolutely continuous, its distribution can be described by a probability density function, which assigns probabilities to intervals; in particular, each individual point must necessarily have probability zero for an absolutely continuous random variable. Not all continuous random variables are absolutely continuous, for example a mixture distribution. Such random variables cannot be described by a probability density or a probability mass function.

=== Random vector ===
A random vector is a column vector $\mathbf{X}=(X_1,...,X_n)^T$ (or its transpose, which is a row vector) whose components are scalar-valued random variables on the same probability space $(\Omega, \mathcal{F}, P)$, where $\Omega$ is the sample space, $\mathcal{F}$ is the sigma-algebra (the collection of all events), and $P$ is the probability measure (a function returning each event's probability).

Random vectors are often used as the underlying implementation of various types of aggregate random variables, e.g. a random matrix, random tree, random sequence, random process, etc.

=== Random matrix ===
A random matrix is a matrix-valued random element. Many important properties of physical systems can be represented mathematically as matrix problems. For example, the thermal conductivity of a lattice can be computed from the dynamical matrix of the particle-particle interactions within the lattice.

=== Random function ===
A random function is a type of random element in which a single outcome is selected from some family of functions, where the family consists some class of all maps from the domain to the codomain. For example, the class may be restricted to all continuous functions or to all step functions. The values determined by a random function evaluated at different points from the same realization would not generally be statistically independent but, depending on the model, values determined at the same or different points from different realisations might well be treated as independent.

=== Random process ===
A Random process is a collection of random variables, representing the evolution of some system of random values over time. This is the probabilistic counterpart to a deterministic process (or deterministic system). Instead of describing a process which can only evolve in one way (as in the case, for example, of solutions of an ordinary differential equation), in a stochastic or random process there is some indeterminacy: even if the initial condition (or starting point) is known, there are several (often infinitely many) directions in which the process may evolve.

In the simple case of discrete time, as opposed to continuous time, a stochastic process involves a sequence of random variables and the time series associated with these random variables (for example, see Markov chain, also known as discrete-time Markov chain).

=== Random field ===
Given a probability space $(\Omega, \mathcal{F}, P)$ and a measurable space X, an X-valued random field is a collection of X-valued random variables indexed by elements in a topological space T. That is, a random field F is a collection

$$\{ F_t : t \in T \}$$

where each $F_t$ is an X-valued random variable.

Several kinds of random fields exist, among them the Markov random field (MRF), Gibbs random field (GRF), conditional random field (CRF), and Gaussian random field. An MRF exhibits the Markovian property

$$P(X_i=x_i|X_j=x_j, i\neq j) =P(X_i=x_i|\partial_i), \,$$

where $\partial_i$ is a set of neighbours of the random variable X_{i}. In other words, the probability that a random variable assumes a value depends on the other random variables only through the ones that are its immediate neighbours. The probability of a random variable in an MRF is given by

$$P(X_i=x_i|\partial_i) = \frac{P(\omega)}{\sum_{\omega'}P(\omega')},$$

where Ω' is the same realization of Ω, except for random variable X_{i}. It is difficult to calculate with this equation, without recourse to the relation between MRFs and GRFs proposed by Julian Besag in 1974.

=== Random measure ===
A random measure is a measure-valued random element. Let X be a complete separable metric space and $\mathfrak{B}(X)$ the σ-algebra of its Borel sets. A Borel measure μ on X is boundedly finite if μ(A) < ∞ for every bounded Borel set A. Let $M_X$ be the space of all boundedly finite measures on $\mathfrak{B}(X)$. Let (Ω, ℱ, P) be a probability space, then a random measure maps from this probability space to the measurable space ($M_X$, $\mathfrak{B}(M_X)$). A measure generally might be decomposed as:

$$\mu=\mu_d + \mu_a = \mu_d + \sum_{n=1}^N \kappa_n \delta_{X_n},$$

Here $\mu_d$ is a diffuse measure without atoms, while $\mu_a$ is a purely atomic measure.

=== Random set ===
A random set is a set-valued random element.

One specific example is a random compact set. Let $(M, d)$ be a complete separable metric space. Let $\mathcal{K}$ denote the set of all compact subsets of $M$. The Hausdorff metric $h$ on $\mathcal{K}$ is defined by

$$h(K_{1}, K_{2}) := \max \left\{ \sup_{a \in K_{1}} \inf_{b \in K_{2}} d(a, b), \sup_{b \in K_{2}} \inf_{a \in K_{1}} d(a, b) \right\}.$$

$(\mathcal{K}, h)$ is also а complete separable metric space. The corresponding open subsets generate a σ-algebra on $\mathcal{K}$, the Borel sigma algebra $\mathcal{B}(\mathcal{K})$ of $\mathcal{K}$.

A random compact set is а measurable function $K$ from а probability space $(\Omega, \mathcal{F}, \mathbb{P})$ into $(\mathcal{K}, \mathcal{B} (\mathcal{K}) )$.

Put another way, a random compact set is a measurable function $K \colon \Omega \to 2^{M}$ such that $K(\omega)$ is almost surely compact and

$$\omega \mapsto \inf_{b \in K(\omega)} d(x, b)$$

is a measurable function for every $x \in M$.

=== Random geometric objects ===
These include random points, random figures, and random shapes.
