= Cumulant =

Set of quantities in probability theory

In probability theory and statistics, the cumulants κ_{n} of a probability distribution are a set of quantities that provide an alternative to the moments of the distribution. Any two probability distributions whose moments are identical will have identical cumulants as well, and vice versa.

The first cumulant is the mean, the second cumulant is the variance, and the third cumulant is the same as the third central moment. But fourth and higher-order cumulants are not equal to central moments. In some cases theoretical treatments of problems in terms of cumulants are simpler than those using moments. In particular, when two or more random variables are statistically independent, the nth-order cumulant of their sum is equal to the sum of their nth-order cumulants. Also, the third and higher-order cumulants of a normal distribution are zero, and it is the only distribution with this property.

Just as for moments, where joint moments are used for collections of random variables, it is possible to define joint cumulants.

== Definition ==
The cumulants of a random variable X are defined using the cumulant generating function (CGF) K(t), which is a generating function that is the natural logarithm of the moment generating function:
$$K(t)=\log\operatorname{E}\left[e^{tX}\right].$$

The cumulants κ_{n} are obtained from a power series expansion of the cumulant generating function:
$$K(t)=\sum_{n=1}^\infty \kappa_{n} \frac{t^{n}}{n!} =\kappa_1 \frac{t}{1!} + \kappa_2 \frac{t^2}{2!}+ \kappa_3 \frac{t^3}{3!}+ \cdots = \mu t + \sigma^2 \frac{t^2}{2} + \cdots.$$

This expansion is a Maclaurin series, so the nth cumulant can be obtained by differentiating the above expansion n times and evaluating the result at zero:
$$\kappa_{n} = K^{(n)}(0).$$

If the moment-generating function does not exist, the cumulants can be defined in terms of the relationship between cumulants and moments discussed later.

=== Alternative definition of the cumulant generating function ===
Some writers prefer to define the cumulant generating function as the natural logarithm of the characteristic function, which is sometimes also called the second characteristic function, second characteristic, or characteristic exponent,
$$H(t)=\log\operatorname{E} \left[e^{i t X}\right]=\sum_{n=1}^\infty \kappa_n \frac{(it)^n}{n!}=\mu it - \sigma^2 \frac{ t^2}{2} + \cdots$$

An advantage of H(t) — in some sense the function K(t) evaluated for purely imaginary arguments — is that E[e^{itX}] is well defined for all real values of t even when E[e^{tX}] is not well defined for all real values of t, such as can occur when there is "too much" probability that X has a large magnitude. Although the function H(t) will be well defined, it will nonetheless mimic K(t) in terms of the length of its Maclaurin series, which may not extend beyond (or, rarely, even to) linear order in the argument t, and in particular the number of cumulants that are well defined will not change. Nevertheless, even when H(t) does not have a long Maclaurin series, it can be used directly in analyzing and, particularly, adding random variables. Both the Cauchy distribution (also called the Lorentzian) and more generally, stable distributions (related to the Lévy distribution) are examples of distributions for which the power-series expansions of the generating functions have only finitely many well-defined terms.

== Some basic properties ==
The $n$th cumulant $\kappa_n(X)$ of (the distribution of) a random variable $X$ enjoys the following properties:

- If $n>1$ and $c$ is constant (i.e. not random) then $\kappa_n(X+c) = \kappa_n(X),$ i.e. the cumulant is translation invariant. (If $n=1$ then we have $\kappa_1(X+c) = \kappa_1(X)+c.)$
- If $c$ is constant (i.e. not random) then $\kappa_n(cX) = c^n\kappa_n(X),$ i.e. the $n$th cumulant is homogeneous of degree $n$.
- If random variables $X_1,\ldots,X_m$ are independent then
  $$\kappa_n(X_1+\cdots+X_m) = \kappa_n(X_1) + \cdots + \kappa_n(X_m)\,.$$
  That is, the cumulant is cumulative — hence the name.

The cumulative property follows quickly by considering the cumulant generating function:
$$\begin{align}
K_{X_1+\cdots+X_m}(t) & =\log\operatorname{E} \left[e^{t(X_1+\cdots+X_m)}\right] \\[5pt]
& = \log \left(\operatorname{E} \left[e^{tX_1}\right] \cdots \operatorname{E} \left[ e^{tX_m} \right] \right) \\[5pt]
& = \log\operatorname{E}\left[e^{tX_1}\right] + \cdots + \log \operatorname{E} \left[ e^{tX_m} \right] \\[5pt]
&= K_{X_1}(t) + \cdots + K_{X_m}(t),
\end{align}$$
so that each cumulant of a sum of independent random variables is the sum of the corresponding cumulants of the addends. That is, when the addends are statistically independent, the mean of the sum is the sum of the means, the variance of the sum is the sum of the variances, the third cumulant (which happens to be the third central moment) of the sum is the sum of the third cumulants, and so on for each order of cumulant.

A distribution with given cumulants κ_{n} can be approximated through an Edgeworth series.

=== First several cumulants as functions of the moments ===
All of the higher cumulants are polynomial functions of the central moments, with integer coefficients, but only in degrees 2 and 3 are the cumulants actually central moments.

Let $\kappa_n(X)$ be the cumulants, $m(X) := \operatorname E\left[X\right]$ be the mean, and $\mu_n(X) := \operatorname E\left[{\left(X-\operatorname E[X]\right)}^n\right] ={}$ be the central moments. Then:

- $\kappa_1 = m = \operatorname{mean}(X)$ (the mean).
- $\kappa_2 = \mu_2 = \operatorname{var}(X)$ (the variance, or second central moment).
- $\kappa_3 = \mu_3$.
- $\kappa_4 = \mu_4 - 3\mu_2^2$. (This is the first case in which cumulants are not simply moments or central moments. The central moments of degree more than 3 lack the cumulative property.)
- $\kappa_5 = \mu_5 - 10 \mu_3 \mu_2$.

== Cumulants of some discrete probability distributions ==
- The constant random variables X = μ. The cumulant generating function is K(t) = μt. The first cumulant is κ_{1} = K′(0) = μ and the other cumulants are zero, κ_{2} = κ_{3} = κ_{4} = ⋅⋅⋅ = 0.
- The Bernoulli distributions, (number of successes in one trial with probability p of success). The cumulant generating function is K(t) = log(1 − p + pe^{t}). The first cumulants are κ_{1} = K '(0) = p and κ_{2} = K′′(0) = p·(1 − p). The cumulants satisfy a recursion formula
  $$\kappa_{n+1}=p (1-p) \frac{d\kappa_n}{dp}.$$
- The geometric distributions, (number of failures before one success with probability p of success on each trial). The cumulant generating function is K(t) = log(p / (1 + (p − 1)e^{t})). The first cumulants are κ_{1} = K′(0) = p^{−1} − 1, and κ_{2} = K′′(0) = κ_{1}p^{−1}. Substituting p = (μ + 1)^{−1} gives K(t) = −log(1 + μ(1−e^{t})) and κ_{1} = μ.
- The Poisson distributions. The cumulant generating function is K(t) = μ(e^{t} − 1). All cumulants are equal to the parameter: κ_{1} = κ_{2} = κ_{3} = ... = μ.
- The binomial distributions, (number of successes in n independent trials with probability p of success on each trial). The special case n = 1 is a Bernoulli distribution. Every cumulant is just n times the corresponding cumulant of the corresponding Bernoulli distribution. The cumulant generating function is K(t) = n log(1 − p + pe^{t}). The first cumulants are κ_{1} = K′(0) = np and κ_{2} = K′′(0) = κ_{1}(1 − p). Substituting p = μ·n^{−1} gives K '(t) = ((μ^{−1} − n^{−1})·e^{−t} + n^{−1})^{−1} and κ_{1} = μ. The limiting case n → +∞ is a Poisson distribution.
- The negative binomial distributions, (number of failures before r successes with probability p of success on each trial). The special case r = 1 is a geometric distribution. Every cumulant is just r times the corresponding cumulant of the corresponding geometric distribution. The derivative of the cumulant generating function is K′(t) = r·((1 − p)^{−1}·e^{−t}−1)^{−1}. The first cumulants are κ_{1} = K′(0) = r·(p^{−1}−1), and κ_{2} = K′′(0) = κ_{1}·p^{−1}. Substituting p = (μ·r^{−1}+1)^{−1} gives K′(t) = ((μ^{−1} + r^{−1})e^{−t} − r^{−1})^{−1} and κ_{1} = μ. Comparing these formulas to those of the binomial distributions explains the name 'negative binomial distribution'. The limiting case r → +∞ is a Poisson distribution.

Introducing the variance-to-mean ratio
$$\varepsilon=\mu^{-1}\sigma^2=\kappa_1^{-1}\kappa_2,$$
the above probability distributions get a unified formula for the derivative of the cumulant generating function:
$$K'(t)=(1+(e^{-t}-1)\varepsilon)^{-1}\mu$$

The second derivative is
$$K''(t)=(\varepsilon-(\varepsilon-1)e^t)^{-2}\mu\varepsilon e^t$$
confirming that the first cumulant is κ_{1} = K′(0) = μ and the second cumulant is κ_{2} = K′′(0) = με.

The constant random variables X = μ have ε = 0.

The binomial distributions have ε = 1 − p so that 0 < ε < 1.

The Poisson distributions have ε = 1.

The negative binomial distributions have ε = p^{−1} so that ε > 1.

Note the analogy to the classification of conic sections by eccentricity: circles ε = 0, ellipses 0 < ε < 1, parabolas ε = 1, hyperbolas ε > 1.

== Cumulants of some continuous probability distributions ==
- For the normal distribution with expected value μ and variance σ^{2}, the cumulant generating function is K(t) = μt + σ^{2}t^{2}/2. The first and second derivatives of the cumulant generating function are K′(t) = μ + σ^{2}·t and K′′(t) = σ^{2}. The cumulants are κ_{1} = μ, κ_{2} = σ^{2}, and κ_{3} = κ_{4} = ⋅⋅⋅ = 0. The special case σ^{2} = 0 is a constant random variable X = μ.
- The cumulants of the uniform distribution on the interval [a, b] are κ_{1} = (a + b) /2, and κ_{n} = (b - a)^{n}B_{n} /n for n ≥ 2, where B_{n} is the nth Bernoulli number.
- The cumulants of the exponential distribution with rate parameter λ are κ_{n} = λ^{−n} (n − 1)!.

== Some properties of the cumulant generating function ==
The cumulant generating function K(t), if it exists, is infinitely differentiable and convex, and passes through the origin. Its first derivative ranges monotonically in the open interval from the infimum to the supremum of the support of the probability distribution, and its second derivative is strictly positive everywhere it is defined, except for the degenerate distribution of a single point mass. The cumulant generating function exists if and only if the tails of the distribution are majorized by an exponential decay, that is, (see Big O notation)
$$\begin{align}
& \exists c>0,\,\, F(x)=O(e^{cx}), x\to-\infty; \text{ and} \\[4pt]
& \exists d>0,\,\, 1-F(x)=O(e^{-dx}),x\to+\infty;
\end{align}$$
where $F$ is the cumulative distribution function. The cumulant generating function will have vertical asymptote(s) at the negative supremum of such c, if such a supremum exists, and at the supremum of such d, if such a supremum exists, otherwise it will be defined for all real numbers.

If the support of a random variable X has finite upper or lower bounds, then its cumulant generating function y = K(t), if it exists, approaches asymptote(s) whose slope is equal to the supremum or infimum of the support,
$$\begin{align}
y & =(t+1)\inf \operatorname{supp} X-\mu(X), \text{ and} \\[5pt]
y & =(t-1)\sup \operatorname{supp}X+\mu(X),
\end{align}$$
respectively, lying above both these lines everywhere. (The integrals
$$\int_{-\infty}^0 \left[t\inf \operatorname{supp}X-K'(t)\right]\,dt, \qquad \int_{\infty}^0 \left[t\inf \operatorname{supp}X-K'(t) \right]\,dt$$
yield the y-intercepts of these asymptotes, since K(0) = 0.)

For a shift of the distribution by c, $K_{X+c}(t)=K_X(t)+ct.$ For a degenerate point mass at c, the cumulant generating function is the straight line $K_c(t)=ct$, and more generally, $K_{X+Y}=K_X+K_Y$ if and only if X and Y are independent and their cumulant generating functions exist; (subindependence and the existence of second moments sufficing to imply independence.)

The natural exponential family of a distribution may be realized by shifting or translating K(t), and adjusting it vertically so that it always passes through the origin: if f is the pdf with cumulant generating function $K(t)=\log M(t),$ and $f|\theta$ is its natural exponential family, then $f(x\mid\theta)=\frac1{M(\theta)}e^{\theta x} f(x),$ and $K(t\mid\theta)=K(t+\theta)-K(\theta).$

If K(t) is finite for a range t_{1} < Re(t) < t_{2} then if t_{1} < 0 < t_{2} then K(t) is analytic and infinitely differentiable for t_{1} < Re(t) < t_{2}. Moreover for t real and t_{1} < t < t_{2} K(t) is strictly convex, and K′(t) is strictly increasing.

== Further properties of cumulants ==
=== A negative result ===
Given the results for the cumulants of the normal distribution, it might be hoped to find families of distributions for which κ_{m} = κ_{m+1} = ⋯ = 0 for some m > 3, with the lower-order cumulants (orders 3 to m − 1) being non-zero. There are no such distributions. The underlying result here is that the cumulant generating function cannot be a finite-order polynomial of degree greater than 2.

=== Cumulants and moments ===
The moment generating function is given by:
$$M(t) = 1+\sum_{n=1}^\infty \frac{\mu'_n t^n}{n!} = \exp \left(\sum_{n=1}^\infty \frac{\kappa_n t^n}{n!}\right) = \exp(K(t)).$$

So the cumulant generating function is the logarithm of the moment generating function
$$K(t) = \log M(t).$$

The first cumulant is the expected value; the second and third cumulants are respectively the second and third central moments (the second central moment is the variance); but the higher cumulants are neither moments nor central moments, but rather more complicated polynomial functions of the moments.

The moments can be recovered in terms of cumulants by evaluating the nth derivative of $\exp(K(t))$ at $t=0$,
$$\mu'_n = M^{(n)}(0) = \left. \frac{\mathrm{d}^n \exp (K(t))}{\mathrm{d}t^n}\right|_{t=0}.$$

Likewise, the cumulants can be recovered in terms of moments by evaluating the nth derivative of $\log M(t)$ at $t=0$,
$$\kappa_n = K^{(n)}(0) = \left. \frac{\mathrm{d}^n \log M(t)}{\mathrm{d}t^n} \right|_{t=0}.$$

The explicit expression for the nth moment in terms of the first n cumulants, and vice versa, can be obtained by using Faà di Bruno's formula for higher derivatives of composite functions. In general, we have
$$\mu'_n = \sum_{k=1}^n B_{n,k}(\kappa_1,\ldots,\kappa_{n-k+1})$$
$$\kappa_n = \sum_{k=1}^n (-1)^{k-1} (k-1)! B_{n,k}(\mu'_1, \ldots, \mu'_{n-k+1}),$$
where $B_{n,k}$ are incomplete (or partial) Bell polynomials.

In the like manner, if the mean is given by $\mu$, the central moment generating function is given by
$$C(t) = \operatorname{E}[e^{t(x-\mu)}] = e^{-\mu t} M(t) = \exp(K(t) - \mu t),$$
and the nth central moment is obtained in terms of cumulants as
$$\mu_n = C^{(n)}(0) = \left. \frac{\mathrm{d}^n}{\mathrm{d}t^n} \exp (K(t) - \mu t) \right|_{t=0} = \sum_{k=1}^n B_{n,k}(0,\kappa_2,\ldots,\kappa_{n-k+1}).$$

Also, for n > 1, the nth cumulant in terms of the central moments is
$$\begin{align}
\kappa_n  & = K^{(n)}(0) = \left. \frac{\mathrm{d}^n}{\mathrm{d}t^n} (\log C(t) + \mu t) \right|_{t=0} \\[4pt]
& = \sum_{k=1}^n (-1)^{k-1} (k-1)! B_{n,k}(0,\mu_2,\ldots,\mu_{n-k+1}).
\end{align}$$

The nth moment μ′_{n} is an nth-degree polynomial in the first n cumulants. The first few expressions are:

$$\begin{align}
\mu'_1 = {} & \kappa_1 \\[5pt]
\mu'_2 = {} & \kappa_2+\kappa_1^2 \\[5pt]
\mu'_3 = {} & \kappa_3+3\kappa_2\kappa_1+\kappa_1^3 \\[5pt]
\mu'_4 = {} & \kappa_4 + 4\kappa_3\kappa_1 + 3\kappa_2^2 + 6\kappa_2\kappa_1^2 + \kappa_1^4 \\[5pt]
\mu'_5 = {} & \kappa_5+5\kappa_4\kappa_1+10\kappa_3\kappa_2 + 10\kappa_3\kappa_1^2 + 15\kappa_2^2\kappa_1 + 10\kappa_2\kappa_1^3 + \kappa_1^5 \\[5pt]
\mu'_6 = {} & \kappa_6 + 6\kappa_5\kappa_1 + 15\kappa_4\kappa_2 + 15\kappa_4\kappa_1^2 + 10\kappa_3^2 + 60\kappa_3\kappa_2\kappa_1 + 20\kappa_3\kappa_1^3 \\
& {} + 15\kappa_2^3 + 45\kappa_2^2\kappa_1^2 + 15\kappa_2\kappa_1^4 + \kappa_1^6.
\end{align}$$

The "prime" distinguishes the moments μ′_{n} from the central moments μ_{n}. To express the central moments as functions of the cumulants, just drop from these polynomials all terms in which κ_{1} appears as a factor:
$$\begin{align}
\mu_1 & =0 \\[4pt]
\mu_2 & =\kappa_2 \\[4pt]
\mu_3 & =\kappa_3 \\[4pt]
\mu_4 & =\kappa_4+3\kappa_2^2 \\[4pt]
\mu_5 & =\kappa_5+10\kappa_3\kappa_2 \\[4pt]
\mu_6 & =\kappa_6+15\kappa_4\kappa_2+10\kappa_3^2+15\kappa_2^3.
\end{align}$$

Similarly, the nth cumulant κ_{n} is an nth-degree polynomial in the first n non-central moments. The first few expressions are:
$$\begin{align}
\kappa_1 = {} & \mu'_1 \\[4pt]
\kappa_2 = {} & \mu'_2-{\mu'_1}^2 \\[4pt]
\kappa_3 = {} & \mu'_3-3\mu'_2\mu'_1+2{\mu'_1}^3 \\[4pt]
\kappa_4 = {} & \mu'_4-4\mu'_3\mu'_1-3{\mu'_2}^2+12\mu'_2{\mu'_1}^2-6{\mu'_1}^4 \\[4pt]
\kappa_5 = {} & \mu'_5-5\mu'_4\mu'_1-10\mu'_3\mu'_2 + 20\mu'_3{\mu'_1}^2 + 30{\mu'_2}^2\mu'_1-60\mu'_2{\mu'_1}^3 + 24{\mu'_1}^5 \\[4pt]
\kappa_6 = {} & \mu'_6-6\mu'_5\mu'_1-15\mu'_4\mu'_2+30\mu'_4{\mu'_1}^2-10{\mu'_3}^2 + 120\mu'_3\mu'_2\mu'_1 \\
& {} - 120\mu'_3{\mu'_1}^3 + 30{\mu'_2}^3 - 270{\mu'_2}^2 {\mu'_1}^2+360\mu'_2{\mu'_1}^4-120{\mu'_1}^6\,.
\end{align}$$

In general, the cumulant is the determinant of a matrix:
$$\kappa_l = (-1)^{l+1}
\left|\begin{array}{cccccccc}
\mu'_1 & 1 & 0 & 0 & 0 & 0 & \ldots & 0 \\
\mu'_2 & \mu'_1 & 1 & 0 & 0 & 0 & \ldots & 0 \\
\mu'_3 & \mu'_2 & \binom21 \mu'_1 & 1 & 0 & 0 & \ldots & 0 \\
\mu'_4 & \mu'_3 & \binom31 \mu'_2 & \binom32 \mu'_1 & 1 & 0 & \ldots & 0 \\
\mu'_5 & \mu'_4 & \binom41 \mu'_3 & \binom42 \mu'_2 & \binom43 \mu'_1 & 1 & \ldots & 0 \\
\vdots & \vdots & \vdots & \vdots & \vdots & \ddots & \ddots & \vdots \\
\mu'_{l-1} & \mu'_{l-2} & \ldots & \ldots & \ldots & \ldots & \ddots & 1 \\
\mu'_l & \mu'_{l-1} & \ldots & \ldots & \ldots & \ldots & \ldots & \binom{l-1}{l-2} \mu'_1
\end{array}\right|$$

To express the cumulants κ_{n} for n > 1 as functions of the central moments, drop from these polynomials all terms in which μ'_{1} appears as a factor:
$$\kappa_2=\mu_2\,$$
$$\kappa_3=\mu_3\,$$
$$\kappa_4=\mu_4-3{\mu_2}^2\,$$
$$\kappa_5=\mu_5-10\mu_3\mu_2\,$$
$$\kappa_6=\mu_6-15\mu_4\mu_2-10{\mu_3}^2+30{\mu_2}^3\,.$$

The cumulants can be related to the moments by differentiating the relationship K(t) = log M(t) with respect to t, giving M′(t) = K′(t) M(t), which conveniently contains no exponentials or logarithms. Equating the coefficient of t^{n−1} / (n−1)! on the left and right sides and using μ′_{0} = 1 gives the following formulas for n ≥ 1:
$$\begin{align}
\mu'_1 = {} & \kappa_1 \\[1pt]
\mu'_2 = {} & \kappa_1\mu'_1+\kappa_2 \\[1pt]
\mu'_3 = {} & \kappa_1\mu'_2+2\kappa_2\mu'_1+\kappa_3 \\[1pt]
\mu'_4 = {} & \kappa_1\mu'_3+3\kappa_2\mu'_2+3\kappa_3\mu'_1+\kappa_4 \\[1pt]
\mu'_5 = {} & \kappa_1\mu'_4+4\kappa_2\mu'_3+6\kappa_3\mu'_2+4\kappa_4\mu'_1+\kappa_5 \\[1pt]
\mu'_6 = {} & \kappa_1\mu'_5+5\kappa_2\mu'_4+10\kappa_3\mu'_3+10\kappa_4\mu'_2+5\kappa_5\mu'_1+\kappa_6 \\[1pt]
\mu'_n = {} & \sum_{m=1}^{n-1}{n-1 \choose m-1}\kappa_m \mu'_{n-m} + \kappa_n\,.
\end{align}$$
These allow either $\kappa_n$ or $\mu'_n$ to be computed from the other using knowledge of the lower-order cumulants and moments. The corresponding formulas for the central moments $\mu_n$ for $n \ge 2$ are formed from these formulas by setting $\mu'_1 = \kappa_1 = 0$ and replacing each $\mu'_n$ with $\mu_n$ for $n \ge 2$:
$$\begin{align}
\mu_2 = {} & \kappa_2 \\[1pt]
\mu_3 = {} & \kappa_3 \\[1pt]
\mu_n = {} & \sum_{m=2}^{n-2}{n-1 \choose m-1}\kappa_m \mu_{n-m} + \kappa_n\,.
\end{align}$$

=== Cumulants and set-partitions ===
These polynomials have a remarkable combinatorial interpretation: the coefficients count certain partitions of sets. A general form of these polynomials is
$$\mu'_n=\sum_{\pi \, \in \, \Pi} \prod_{B \, \in \, \pi} \kappa_{|B|}$$
where

- π runs through the list of all partitions of a set of size n;
- "B ∈ π" means B is one of the "blocks" into which the set is partitioned; and
- |B| is the size of the set B.

Thus each monomial is a constant times a product of cumulants in which the sum of the indices is n (e.g., in the term κ_{3} κ_{2}^{2} κ_{1}, the sum of the indices is 3 + 2 + 2 + 1 = 8; this appears in the polynomial that expresses the 8th moment as a function of the first eight cumulants). A partition of the integer n corresponds to each term. The coefficient in each term is the number of partitions of a set of n members that collapse to that partition of the integer n when the members of the set become indistinguishable.

=== Cumulants and combinatorics ===
Further connection between cumulants and combinatorics can be found in the work of Gian-Carlo Rota, where links to invariant theory, symmetric functions, and binomial sequences are studied via umbral calculus.

== Joint cumulants ==
The joint cumulant κ of several random variables X_{1}, ..., X_{n} is defined as the coefficient κ_{1,...,1}(X_{1}, ..., X_{n}) in the Maclaurin series of the multivariate cumulant generating function, see Section 3.1 in,
$$G(t_1,\dots,t_n)=\log \mathrm{E}(\mathrm{e}^{\sum_{j=1}^n t_j X_j})
=\sum_{k_1,\ldots,k_n} \kappa_{k_1,\ldots,k_n} \frac{t_1^{k_1} \cdots t_n^{k_n}}{k_1! \cdots k_n!} \,.$$
Note that
$$\kappa_{k_1,\dots,k_n}
= \left.\left(\frac{\mathrm{d}}{\mathrm{d} t_1}\right)^{k_1} \cdots \left(\frac{\mathrm{d}}{\mathrm{d} t_n}\right)^{k_n} G(t_1,\dots,t_n) \right|_{t_1 = \dots = t_n = 0}\,,$$
and, in particular
$$\kappa(X_1,\ldots,X_n)
= \left. \frac{\mathrm{d}^n}{\mathrm{d} t_1 \cdots \mathrm{d} t_n} G(t_1,\dots,t_n) \right|_{t_1 = \dots = t_n = 0}\,.$$
As with a single variable, the generating function and cumulant can instead be defined via
$$H(t_1,\dots,t_n)
=\log \mathrm{E}(\mathrm{e}^{\sum_{j=1}^n i t_j X_j})
=\sum_{k_1,\ldots,k_n} \kappa_{k_1,\ldots,k_n} i^{k_1+\cdots+k_n} \frac{t_1^{k_1} \cdots t_n^{k_n}}{k_1! \cdots k_n!}\,,$$
in which case
$$\kappa_{k_1,\dots,k_n} = (-i)^{k_1+\cdots+k_n} \left.\left(\frac{\mathrm{d}}{\mathrm{d} t_1}\right)^{k_1} \cdots \left(\frac{\mathrm{d}}{\mathrm{d} t_n}\right)^{k_n} H(t_1,\dots,t_n) \right|_{t_1 = \dots = t_n = 0}\,,$$
and
$$\kappa(X_1,\ldots,X_n)
= \left. (-i)^{n} \frac{\mathrm{d}^n}{\mathrm{d} t_1 \cdots \mathrm{d} t_n} H(t_1,\dots,t_n) \right|_{t_1 = \dots = t_n = 0}\,.$$

=== Repeated random variables and relation between the coefficients κ_{k_{1}, ..., k_{n}} ===
Observe that $\kappa_{k_1,\dots,k_n} (X_1,\ldots,X_n)$ can also be written as
$$\kappa_{k_1,\dots,k_n}
= \left. \frac{\mathrm{d}^{k_1}}{\mathrm{d} t_{1,1} \cdots \mathrm{d} t_{1,k_1}} \cdots \frac{\mathrm{d}^{k_n}}{\mathrm{d} t_{n,1} \cdots \mathrm{d} t_{n,k_n}} G\left(\sum_{j=1}^{k_1}t_{1,j},\dots,\sum_{j=1}^{k_n}t_{n,j}\right) \right|_{t_{i,j}=0},$$
from which we conclude that
$$\kappa_{k_1,\dots,k_n} (X_1,\ldots,X_n)
= \kappa_{1,\ldots,1} ( \underbrace{X_1,\dots,X_1}_{k_1}, \ldots , \underbrace{X_n,\dots,X_n}_{k_n} ) .$$
For example
$$\kappa_{2,0,1}(X,Y,Z) = \kappa(X,X,Z),\,$$
and
$$\kappa_{0,0,n,0}(X,Y,Z,T) = \kappa_{n}(Z) = \kappa(\underbrace{Z,\dots,Z}_{n}) .\,$$
In particular, the last equality shows that the cumulants of a single random variable are the joint cumulants of multiple copies of that random variable.

=== Relation with mixed moments ===
The joint cumulant of random variables can be expressed as an alternate sum of products of their mixed moments, see Equation (3.2.7) in,
$$\kappa(X_1,\dots,X_n)=\sum_\pi (|\pi|-1)!(-1)^{|\pi|-1}\prod_{B\in\pi}E\left(\prod_{i\in B}X_i\right)$$
where π runs through the list of all partitions of {1, ..., n}; where B runs through the list of all blocks of the partition π; and where |π| is the number of parts in the partition.

For example,
$$\kappa(X)=\operatorname E(X),$$
is the expected value of $X$,
$$\kappa(X,Y)=\operatorname E(XY) - \operatorname E(X) \operatorname E(Y),$$
is the covariance of $X$ and $Y$, and
$$\kappa(X,Y,Z)=\operatorname E(XYZ) - \operatorname E(XY) \operatorname E(Z) - \operatorname E(XZ) \operatorname E(Y) - \operatorname E(YZ) \operatorname E(X) + 2\operatorname E(X)\operatorname E(Y)\operatorname E(Z).\,$$

For zero-mean random variables $X_1,\ldots,X_n$, any mixed moment of the form $\prod_{B\in\pi} E\left(\prod_{i\in B} X_i\right)$ vanishes if $\pi$ is a partition of $\{ 1,\ldots,n \}$ which contains a singleton $B=\{k\}$. Hence, the expression of their joint cumulant in terms of mixed moments simplifies. For example, if X,Y,Z,W are zero mean random variables, we have
$$\kappa(X,Y,Z) = \operatorname E(XYZ).\,$$
$$\kappa(X,Y,Z,W) = \operatorname E(XYZW) - \operatorname E(XY) \operatorname E(ZW) - \operatorname E(XZ) \operatorname E(YW) - \operatorname E(XW) \operatorname E(YZ).\,$$

More generally, any coefficient of the Maclaurin series can also be expressed in terms of mixed moments, although there are no concise formulae. Indeed, as noted above, one can write it as a joint cumulant by repeating random variables appropriately, and then apply the above formula to express it in terms of mixed moments. For example
$$\kappa_{201}(X,Y,Z) = \kappa(X,X,Z)=\operatorname E(X^2Z)  -2\operatorname E(XZ)\operatorname E(X) - \operatorname E(X^2)\operatorname E(Z) + 2\operatorname E(X)^2\operatorname E(Z).\,$$

If some of the random variables are independent of all of the others, then any cumulant involving two (or more) independent random variables is zero.

The combinatorial meaning of the expression of mixed moments in terms of cumulants is easier to understand than that of cumulants in terms of mixed moments, see Equation (3.2.6) in:
$$\operatorname E(X_1\cdots X_n)=\sum_\pi\prod_{B\in\pi}\kappa(X_i : i \in B).$$

For example:
$$\operatorname E(XYZ) = \kappa(X,Y,Z) + \kappa(X,Y)\kappa(Z) + \kappa(X,Z)\kappa(Y) + \kappa(Y,Z)\kappa(X) + \kappa(X)\kappa(Y)\kappa(Z).\,$$

=== Further properties ===
Another important property of joint cumulants is multilinearity:
$$\kappa(X+Y,Z_1,Z_2,\dots) = \kappa(X,Z_1,Z_2,\ldots) + \kappa(Y,Z_1,Z_2,\ldots).\,$$

Just as the second cumulant is the variance, the joint cumulant of just two random variables is the covariance. The familiar identity
$$\operatorname{var}(X+Y) = \operatorname{var}(X) + 2\operatorname{cov}(X,Y) + \operatorname{var}(Y)\,$$
generalizes to cumulants:
$$\kappa_n(X+Y)=\sum_{j=0}^n {n \choose j} \kappa( \, \underbrace{X,\dots,X}_j, \underbrace{Y,\dots,Y}_{n-j}\,).\,$$

=== Conditional cumulants and the law of total cumulance ===
The law of total expectation and the law of total variance generalize naturally to conditional cumulants. The case n = 3, expressed in the language of (central) moments rather than that of cumulants, says
$$\mu_3(X) = \operatorname E(\mu_3(X\mid Y)) + \mu_3(\operatorname E(X\mid Y)) + 3 \operatorname{cov}(\operatorname E(X\mid Y), \operatorname{var} (X\mid Y)).$$

In general,
$$\kappa(X_1,\dots,X_n)=\sum_\pi \kappa(\kappa(X_{\pi_1}\mid Y), \dots, \kappa(X_{\pi_b}\mid Y))$$
where

- the sum is over all partitions π of the set {1, ..., n} of indices, and
- π_{1}, ..., π_{b} are all of the "blocks" of the partition π; the expression κ(X_{π_{m}}) indicates that the joint cumulant of the random variables whose indices are in that block of the partition.

=== Conditional cumulants and the conditional expectation ===
For certain settings, a derivative identity can be established between the conditional cumulant and the conditional expectation. For example, suppose that Y = X + Z where Z is standard normal independent of X, then for any X it holds that
$$\kappa_{n+1}(X\mid Y=y) =  \frac{ \mathrm{d}^n}{ \mathrm{d} y^n}\operatorname E(X\mid Y = y), \, n \in \mathbb{N}, \, y \in \mathbb{R}.$$
The results can also be extended to the exponential family.

== Relation to statistical physics ==
In statistical physics many extensive quantities – that is quantities that are proportional to the volume or size of a given system – are related to cumulants of random variables. The deep connection is that in a large system an extensive quantity like the energy or number of particles can be thought of as the sum of (say) the energy associated with a number of nearly independent regions. The fact that the cumulants of these nearly independent random variables will (nearly) add make it reasonable that extensive quantities should be expected to be related to cumulants.

A system in equilibrium with a thermal bath at temperature T has a fluctuating internal energy E, which can be considered a random variable drawn from a distribution $E\sim p(E)$. The partition function of the system is
$$Z(\beta) = \sum_i e^{-\beta E_i} ,$$
where β = 1/(kT) and k is the Boltzmann constant and the notation $\langle A \rangle$ has been used rather than $\operatorname{E}[A]$ for the expectation value to avoid confusion with the energy, E. Hence the first and second cumulant for the energy E give the average energy and heat capacity.
$$\begin{align}
\langle E \rangle_c & = \frac{\partial \log Z}{\partial (-\beta)} = \langle E \rangle \\[6pt]
\langle E^2 \rangle_c & = \frac{\partial\langle E\rangle_c}{\partial (-\beta)} = k T^2 \frac{\partial \langle E\rangle}{\partial T} = kT^2C
\end{align}$$

The Helmholtz free energy expressed in terms of
$$F(\beta) = -\beta^{-1}\log Z(\beta) \,$$
further connects thermodynamic quantities with cumulant generating function for the energy. Thermodynamics properties that are derivatives of the free energy, such as its internal energy, entropy, and specific heat capacity, all can be readily expressed in terms of these cumulants. Other free energies can be a function of other variables such as the magnetic field or chemical potential $\mu$, e.g.
$$\Omega=-\beta^{-1}\log\left(\left\langle e^{-\beta (E + \mu N)} \right\rangle\right),$$
where N is the number of particles and $\Omega$ is the grand potential. Again the close relationship between the definition of the free energy and the cumulant generating function implies that various derivatives of this free energy can be written in terms of joint cumulants of E and N.

== History ==
The history of cumulants is discussed by Anders Hald.

Cumulants were first introduced by Thorvald N. Thiele, in 1889, who called them semi-invariants. They were first called cumulants in a 1932 paper by Ronald Fisher and John Wishart. Fisher was publicly reminded of Thiele's work by Neyman, who also notes previous published citations of Thiele brought to Fisher's attention. Stephen Stigler has said that the name cumulant was suggested to Fisher in a letter from Harold Hotelling. In a paper published in 1929, Fisher had called them cumulative moment functions.

The partition function in statistical physics was introduced by Josiah Willard Gibbs in 1901. The free energy is often called Gibbs free energy. In statistical mechanics, cumulants are also known as Ursell functions relating to a publication in 1927.

== Cumulants in generalized settings ==
=== Formal cumulants ===
More generally, the cumulants of a sequence { m_{n} : n = 1, 2, 3, ... }, not necessarily the moments of any probability distribution, are, by definition,
$$1+\sum_{n=1}^\infty \frac{m_n t^n}{n!} = \exp \left( \sum_{n=1}^\infty \frac{\kappa_n t^n}{n!} \right) ,$$
where the values of κ_{n} for n = 1, 2, 3, ... are found formally, i.e., by algebra alone, in disregard of questions of whether any series converges. All of the difficulties of the "problem of cumulants" are absent when one works formally. The simplest example is that the second cumulant of a probability distribution must always be nonnegative, and is zero only if all of the higher cumulants are zero. Formal cumulants are subject to no such constraints.

=== Bell numbers ===
In combinatorics, the nth Bell number is the number of partitions of a set of size n. All of the cumulants of the sequence of Bell numbers are equal to 1. The Bell numbers are the moments of the Poisson distribution with expected value 1.

=== Cumulants of a polynomial sequence of binomial type ===
For any sequence { κ_{n} : n = 1, 2, 3, ... } of scalars in a field of characteristic zero, being considered formal cumulants, there is a corresponding sequence { μ′ : n = 1, 2, 3, ... } of formal moments, given by the polynomials above. For those polynomials, construct a polynomial sequence in the following way. Out of the polynomial
$$\begin{align}
\mu'_6 = \kappa_6 & + 6\kappa_5\kappa_1 + 15\kappa_4\kappa_2 + 15\kappa_4\kappa_1^2 + 10\kappa_3^2+60\kappa_3\kappa_2\kappa_1 \\[4pt]
& {} + 20\kappa_3\kappa_1^3 + 15\kappa_2^3 + 45\kappa_2^2\kappa_1^2 + 15\kappa_2\kappa_1^4 + \kappa_1^6
\end{align}$$
make a new polynomial in these plus one additional variable x:
$$\begin{align}
p_6(x)
= \kappa_6 \,x {}
& + \left(6\kappa_5\kappa_1 + 15\kappa_4\kappa_2 + 10\kappa_3^2\right) x^2 + \left(15\kappa_4\kappa_1^2 + 60\kappa_3\kappa_2\kappa_1 + 15\kappa_2^3\right) x^3 \\
& {} + 45\kappa_2^2\kappa_1^2 \, x^4 + 15\kappa_2\kappa_1^4 \, x^5 + \kappa_1^6 \, x^6,
\end{align}$$
and then generalize the pattern. The pattern is that the numbers of blocks in the aforementioned partitions are the exponents on x. Each coefficient is a polynomial in the cumulants; these are the Bell polynomials, named after Eric Temple Bell.

This sequence of polynomials is of binomial type. In fact, no other sequences of binomial type exist; every polynomial sequence of binomial type is completely determined by its sequence of formal cumulants.

=== Free cumulants ===
In the above moment-cumulant formula
$$\operatorname E(X_1\cdots X_n)=\sum_\pi\prod_{B\,\in\,\pi}\kappa(X_i : i\in B)$$
for joint cumulants, one sums over all partitions of the set { 1, ..., n }. If instead, one sums only over the noncrossing partitions, then, by solving these formulae for the $\kappa$ in terms of the moments, one gets free cumulants rather than conventional cumulants treated above. These free cumulants were introduced by Roland Speicher and play a central role in free probability theory. In that theory, rather than considering independence of random variables, defined in terms of tensor products of algebras of random variables, one considers instead free independence of random variables, defined in terms of free products of algebras.

The ordinary cumulants of degree higher than 2 of the normal distribution are zero. The free cumulants of degree higher than 2 of the Wigner semicircle distribution are zero. This is one respect in which the role of the Wigner distribution in free probability theory is analogous to that of the normal distribution in conventional probability theory.

== See also ==
- Entropic value at risk
- Cumulant generating function from a multiset
- Cornish–Fisher expansion
- Edgeworth expansion
- Polykay
- k-statistic, a minimum-variance unbiased estimator of a cumulant
- Ursell function
- Total position spread tensor as an application of cumulants to analyse the electronic wave function in quantum chemistry.
