= John Gordon Skellam =

John Gordon Skellam (1914-1979) was a statistician and ecologist, who discovered the Skellam distribution.

Skellam was born in Staffordshire. He was educated at Hanley High School where he won several scholarships including free admission to New College in Oxford. He was one of the most respected members of the British Region of the Biometric Society.

In 1951, John G. Skellam developed the reaction-diffusion model of invasion biology. This model describes the dynamics of populations, which simultaneously develops and spreads, and provides that the invasion front moves with constant speed. He explained on the basis of habitation muskrat introduced to Europe that only by chance the species may be in a place where it would have to grow.

Skellam has provided a model that allows to take the dynamics of populations as a random variable at any time t. Its stochastic form is much more flexible than previous deterministic equations.

== Bibliography ==
- Skellam, J. G. (1946). "The Frequency Distribution of the Difference Between Two Poisson Variates Belonging to Different Populations". Journal of the Royal Statistical Society. 109 (3): 296. doi:10.2307/2981372. JSTOR 2981372.
- Skellam, J. G. (1951). "Random Dispersal in Theoretical Populations" (PDF). Biometrika. 38 (1–2): 196–218. doi:10.1093/biomet/38.1-2.196. PMID 14848123.

== See also ==
- Skellam distribution
