= Roland Speicher =

German mathematician (born 1960)

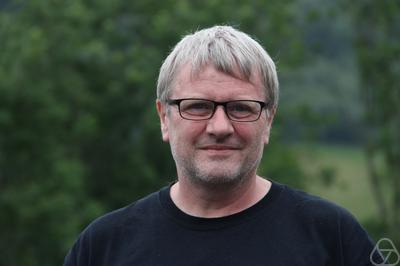
- Speicher at Oberwolfach, 2015
- Education: Heidelberg University
- Awards: Jeffery–Williams Prize (2012); ICM invited speaker (2014)
- Scientific career
- Workplaces: Saarland University
- Thesis: Quantenstochastische Prozesse auf der Cuntz-Algebra (1989)
- Doctoral advisor: Wilhelm Freiherr

Roland Speicher (born 12 June 1960) is a German mathematician, known for his work on free probability theory. He is a professor at the Saarland University. After winning the 1979 German national competition Jugend forscht in the field of mathematics and computer science, Speicher studied physics and mathematics at the Universities of Saarbrücken, Freiburg and Heidelberg. He received in 1989 his doctorate from Heidelberg University under the supervision of Wilhelm Freiherr von Waldenfels with thesis Quantenstochastische Prozesse auf der Cuntz-Algebra (Quantum Stochastic Processes on the Cuntz Algebra). From 2000 to 2010 Speicher was a professor at Queen's University in Kingston, Ontario. Since 2010 he is at the University of the Saarland.

His research deals with free probability (with application to random matrices, statistical mechanics and operator algebras) and their combinatorial aspects and with operator algebras.

In 2012, Speicher received the Jeffery–Williams Prize. He also received the Research Excellence Award of the President of Ontario. In 2014, he was an invited speaker with talk Free Probability and Random Matrices at the ICM in Seoul.

Speicher is married and has four children.

== Selected publications ==
- Mingo, James A.; Speicher, Roland (2017). Free probability and random matrices. New York. ISBN 978-1-4939-6942-5. OCLC 992119245.
- Nica, Alexandru; Speicher, Roland (7 September 2006). Lectures on the Combinatorics of Free Probability. Cambridge University Press. doi:10.1017/cbo9780511735127. ISBN 978-0-521-85852-6.
- Speicher, Roland (1998). "Combinatorial theory of the free product with amalgamation and operator-valued free probability theory". Memoirs of the American Mathematical Society. 132 (627). American Mathematical Society (AMS): 0. doi:10.1090/memo/0627. ISSN 0065-9266.
