= Zero-truncated Poisson distribution =

Conditional Poisson distribution restricted to positive integers

In probability theory, the zero-truncated Poisson distribution (ZTP distribution) is a certain discrete probability distribution whose support is the set of positive integers. This distribution is also known as the conditional Poisson distribution or the positive Poisson distribution. It is the conditional probability distribution of a Poisson-distributed random variable, given that the value of the random variable is not zero. Thus it is impossible for a ZTP random variable to be zero. Consider for example the random variable of the number of items in a shopper's basket at a supermarket checkout line. Presumably a shopper does not stand in line with nothing to buy (i.e., the minimum purchase is 1 item), so this phenomenon may follow a ZTP distribution.

Since the ZTP is a truncated distribution with the truncation stipulated as k > 0, one can derive the probability mass function g(k;λ) from a standard Poisson distribution f(k;λ) as follows:

$$g(k;\lambda) = P(X = k \mid X > 0) =
\frac{f(k;\lambda)}{1-f(0;\lambda)} =
\frac{\lambda ^ k e^{- \lambda} }{k ! \left ( 1 - e^{- \lambda} \right )} = \frac{\lambda^k}{(e^\lambda-1)k!}$$

The mean is

$$\operatorname{E}[X]=\frac{\lambda}{1-e^{-\lambda}}=\frac{\lambda e^\lambda}{e^\lambda-1}$$

and the variance is

$$\operatorname{Var}[X]=\frac{\lambda+\lambda^2}{1-e^{-\lambda}} - \frac{\lambda^2 }{(1-e^{-\lambda})^2} = \operatorname{E}[X](1+\lambda-\operatorname{E}[X])$$

== Parameter estimation ==
The method of moments estimator $\widehat{\lambda}$ for the parameter $\lambda$ is obtained by solving

$$\frac{\widehat{\lambda}}{1-e^{-\widehat{\lambda}}} = \bar{x}$$

where $\bar{x}$ is the sample mean.

This equation has a solution in terms of the Lambert W function. In practice, a solution may be found using numerical methods.

== Generating zero-truncated Poisson-distributed random variables ==
Random variables sampled from the zero-truncated Poisson distribution may be achieved using algorithms derived from Poisson distribution sampling algorithms.

init:
    Let k ← 1, t ← e−λ / (1 - e−λ) * λ, s ← t.
    Generate uniform random number u in [0,1].
while s < u do:
    k ← k + 1.
    t ← t * λ / k.
    s ← s + t.
return k.

The cost of the procedure above is linear in k, which may be large for large values of $\lambda$. Given access to an efficient sampler for non-truncated Poisson random variates, a non-iterative approach involves sampling from a truncated exponential distribution representing the time of the first event in a Poisson point process, conditional on such an event existing. A simple Python implementation with NumPy is:

def sample_zero_truncated_poisson(rate):
    u = np.random.uniform(np.exp(-rate), 1)
    t = -np.log(u)
    return 1 + np.random.poisson(rate - t)
