= Polykay =

In statistics, a polykay, or generalised k-statistic, (denoted $k_{r,s}$) is a statistic defined as a linear combination of sample moments.

== Etymology ==
The word polykay was coined by American mathematician John Tukey in 1956, from poly, "many" or "much", and kay, the phonetic spelling of the letter "k", as in k-statistic.
