= Free probability =

Mathematical theory on random variables

Free probability is a mathematical theory that studies non-commutative random variables. The "freeness" or free independence property is the analogue of the classical notion of independence, and it is connected with free products.

This theory was initiated by Dan Voiculescu around 1986 in order to attack the free group factors isomorphism problem, an important unsolved problem in the theory of operator algebras. Given a free group on some number of generators, we can consider the von Neumann algebra generated by the group algebra, which is a type II_{1} factor. The isomorphism problem asks whether these are isomorphic for different numbers of generators. It is not even known if any two free group factors are isomorphic. This is similar to Tarski's free group problem, which asks whether two different non-abelian finitely generated free groups have the same elementary theory.

Later connections to random matrix theory, combinatorics, representations of symmetric groups, large deviations, quantum information theory and other theories were established. Free probability is currently undergoing active research.

== Noncommutative random variables and freeness ==
=== Noncommutative random variables ===
Let $\mathcal A$ a unital algebra, such as a C*-algebra or a von Neumann algebra, equipped with an "adjoint" operation. Suppose $\mathcal A$ is equipped with a "trace", that is, a linear functional $\phi:\mathcal A\rightarrow\mathbb C$ that behaves like the normalized trace of matrices. That is, we assume that $\phi(1)=1$, that $\phi(a^*)=\overline{\phi(a)}$, that $\phi(ab)=\phi(ba)$, and that $\phi(a^*a)\ge 0$, with equality only if $a=0$. We refer to elements of $\mathcal A$ as (noncommutative) random variables and to $\phi(a)$ as the expectation of $a$.

The prototypical example of this setup is the one in which $A$ is the algebra of all $N\times N$ matrices with entries in $\mathbb C$, the adjoint $*$ is the usual conjugate transpose, and where $\phi$ is the normalized trace, that is, $1/N$ times the usual matrix trace.

=== Definition of freeness ===
Suppose $\mathcal A_1,\ldots,\mathcal A_n$ are unital subalgebras of $\mathcal A$ (typically but not always assumed to be $*$-algebras). Then we say that the algebras are free or freely independent if $\phi(a_1a_2\cdots a_k)=0$ whenever each $a_i$ has zero expectation and belongs to one of the subalgebras and no two consecutive elements belong to the same subalgebra.

We then say that random variables $a_1,\ldots,a_n$ are free (or freely independent) if the unital algebras generated by them are freely independent. We say that $a_1,\ldots,a_n$ are $*$-free if the unital $*$-algebras generated by them are free. (The concept of $*$-freeness is generally more useful than freeness; thus, some authors use the term "freeness" to mean $*$-freeness.)

=== Asymptotic freeness ===
As mentioned above, one of the key reasons for interest in free probability is its connection to random matrix theory. This connection comes from Voiculescu's asymptotic freeness result. It says, roughly, that if $X_1^N,\ldots,X_k^N$ are independent $N\times N$ random matrices and at least $k-1$ of them are invariant in law under conjugation by arbitrary unitary matrices, then these random matrices are asymptotically free. Asymptotic freeness indicates that in the $N\rightarrow\infty$ limit, the matrices can be modeled by freely independent elements $x_1,\ldots,x_k$ in a tracial von Neumann algebra.

One notable application of this result is to compute the limiting eigenvalue distribution of the sum of two Hermitian random matrices $X_1^N,X_2^N$ in terms of the limiting eigenvalues distributions of the two matrices separately, using an operation known as the free additive convolution.

== Law of a normal random variable ==
Suppose $a$ is a normal random variable in $A$, meaning that $a^*a=aa^*$. Then the spectral theorem applies and associates to $a$ a projection-valued measure $\sigma_a$. We then define the law (or spectral distribution) of $a$ to the real-valued probability measure $\mu_a$ given by $\mu_a(E)=\phi(\sigma_a(E))$. Then $\mu_a$ is the unique measure supported on the spectrum of $a$ such that
$$\int_{\mathbb C}z^j\bar z^k d\mu_a(z)=\phi[a^j(a^*)^k]$$
for all non-negative integers $j$ and $k$. In the case of a self-adjoint element $a$ (i.e., $a^*=a$), the law $\mu_a$ of $a$ is the unique compactly supported measure on $\mathbb R$ such that
$$\int_{\mathbb R}x^j d\mu_a(x)=\phi[a^j]$$
for all non-negative integers $j$.

Suppose for example that $\phi(a^j)$ is zero when $j$ is odd and equals the $j/2$-th Catalan number when $j$ is even. Then the law of $a$ will be the standard Wigner semicircle distribution on $[-2,2]$.

In the case that $\mathcal A$ is the algebra of $N\times N$ matrices and $a$ is a normal matrix, the law of $a$ is the empirical spectral measure of $a$, that is, the probability measure putting mass $1/N$ at each eigenvalue of $a$.

== History of the subject ==
One of the goals of free probability (still unaccomplished) was to construct new invariants of von Neumann algebras and free dimension is regarded as a reasonable candidate for such an invariant. The main tool used for the construction of free dimension is free entropy.

The relation of free probability with random matrices is a key reason for the wide use of free probability in other subjects. Voiculescu introduced the concept of freeness around 1983 in an operator algebraic context; at the beginning there was no relation at all with random matrices. This connection was only revealed later in 1991 by Voiculescu; he was motivated by the fact that the limit distribution which he found in his free central limit theorem had appeared before in Wigner's semi-circle law in the random matrix context.

The free cumulant functional (introduced by Roland Speicher) plays a major role in the theory. It is related to the lattice of noncrossing partitions of the set { 1, ..., n } in the same way in which the classic cumulant functional is related to the lattice of all partitions of that set.

== See also ==
- Random matrix
- Wigner semicircle distribution
- Circular law
- Free convolution
