= Problems and Theorems in Analysis =

Problem book in mathematical analysis

Problems and Theorems in Analysis (German: Aufgaben und Lehrsätze aus der Analysis) is a two-volume problem book in analysis by George Pólya and Gábor Szegő. Published in 1925, the two volumes are titled (I) Series. Integral Calculus. Theory of Functions.; and (II) Theory of Functions. Zeros. Polynomials. Determinants. Number Theory. Geometry.

The volumes are highly regarded for the quality of their problems and their method of organisation, not by topic but by method of solution, with a focus on cultivating the student's problem-solving skills. Each volume contains problems at the beginning and (brief) solutions at the end. As two authors have put it, "there is a general consensus among mathematicians that the two-volume Pólya-Szegő is the best written and most useful problem book in the history of mathematics."

== Background ==
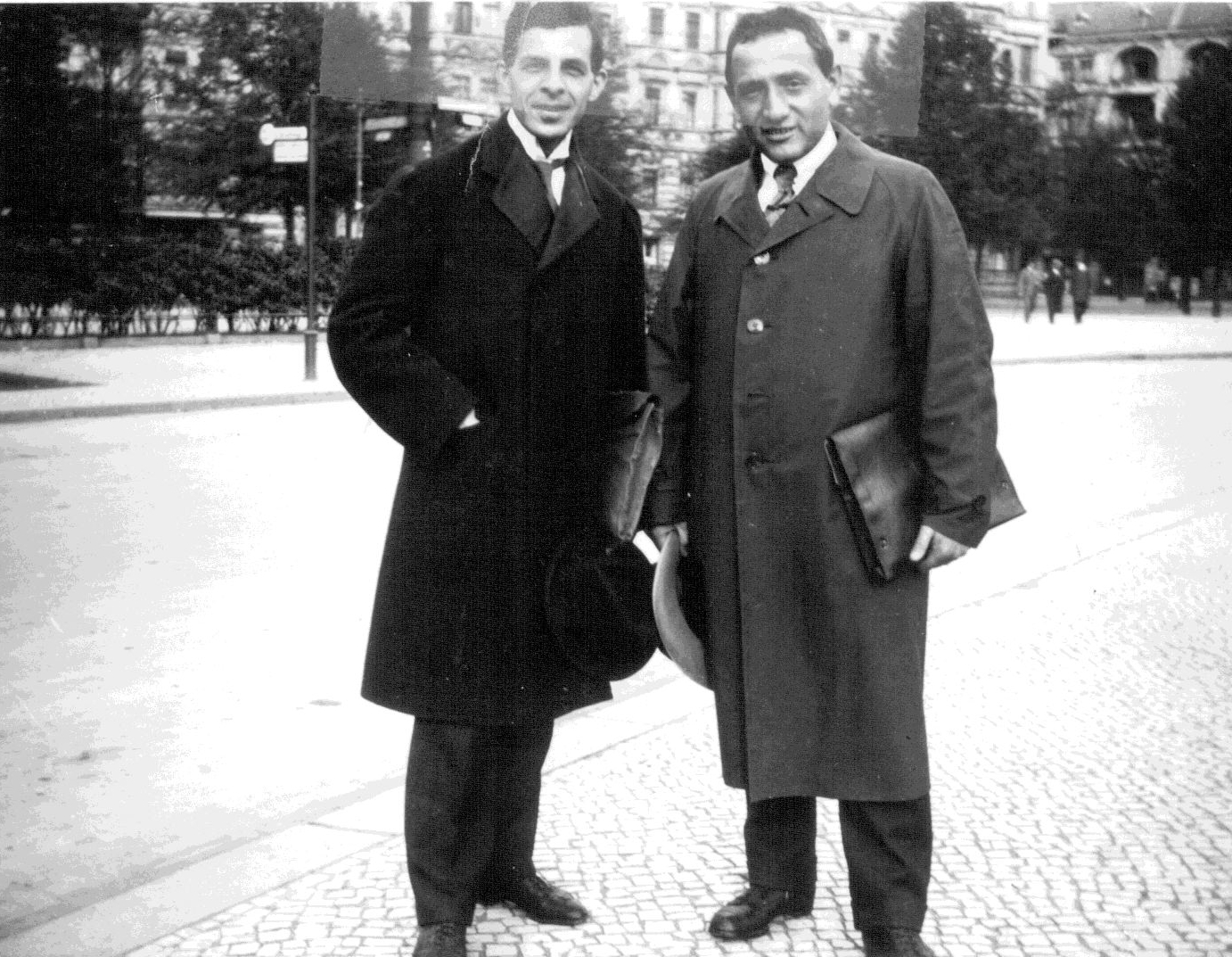
Szegő (left) and Polya (right) in Berlin, 1925, delivering the original manuscript of Problems and Theorems to Springer

It was Pólya who had the idea for a comprehensive problem book in analysis first, but he realised he would not be able complete it alone. He decided to write it with Szegő, who had been a friend of Pólya's since 1913, when the pair met in Budapest (at this time, Szegő was only 17, while Pólya was a postdoctoral researcher of 25). Szegő's early career was intertwined with Pólya, his first two papers concerned problems posed by Pólya. However Pólya believed their areas of expertise were sufficiently different that the collaboration would prove fruitful. Pólya and Szegő signed the contract with Springer-Verlag for the book in 1923 and it was published by 1925. Pólya later wrote of the period in which they wrote the book:

It was a wonderful time; we worked with enthusiasm and concentration. We had similar backgrounds. We were both influenced, like all other young Hungarian mathematicians of that time, by Leopold Fejér. We were both readers of the same well directed Hungarian Mathematical Journal for high school students that stressed problem solving. We were interested in the same kind of questions, in the same topics; but one of us knew more about one topic and the other more about some other topic. It was a fine collaboration. The book Aufgaben und Lehrsatze aus der Analysis, the result of our cooperation, is my best work and also the best work of Gábor Szegő.

Writing Problems and Theorems was an intense experience for both young mathematicians. Pólya was a professor in Zurich and Szegő was a Privatdozent in Berlin, so both had independent workloads. Pólya's wife worried he might have a nervous breakdown. Both were also under threat by the rise of antisemitism in Central Europe (Pólya and Szegő were Hungarian Jews). Financial difficulties, on top of pessimism about appointment to a German university, convinced Pólya to move to England in 1925. Szegő took longer to flee, not leaving Germany until 1934 when Pólya and Harald Bohr convinced him to accept a post at Washington University in St. Louis. By this time the Nazis had already begun purging Jewish professors from German universities. Szegő and Pólya (who collaborated on little after the problem book) were reunited in America in the 1950s, in the mathematics department of Stanford University.

== Contents ==
Although the book's title refers only to analysis, a broad range of problems are contained within. It starts in combinatorics, and quickly branches out from mathematical analysis to number theory, geometry, linear algebra, and even some physics. The specific topics treated bear witness to the special interests of Pólya (Descartes' rule of signs, Pólya's enumeration theorem), Szegö (polynomials, trigonometric polynomials, and his own work in orthogonal polynomials) and sometimes both (the zeros of polynomials and analytic functions, complex analysis in general). Many of the book's problems are not new, and their solutions include back-references to their original sources. The section on geometry (IX) contains many problems contributed by Loewner (in differential geometry) and Hirsch (in algebraic geometry).

The book was unique at the time because of its arrangement, less by topic and more by method of solution, so arranged in order to build up the student's problem-solving abilities. The preface of the book contains some remarks on general problem solving and mathematical heuristics which anticipate Pólya's later works on that subject (Mathematics and Plausible Reasoning, How to Solve It). The pair held practice sessions, in which the problems were put to university students and worked through as a class (with some of the representative problems solved by the teacher, and the harder problems set as homework). They went through portions of the book at a rate of about one chapter a semester.

A typical example of the progression of questions in Problems and Theorems in Analysis is given by the first three questions in (the American edition of) volume I:

1. In how many different ways can you change one dollar? That is, in how many different ways can you pay 100 cents using five different kinds of coins, cents, nickels, dimes, quarters and half-dollars (worth 1, 5, 10, 25, and 50 cents, respectively)?

2. Let n stand for a non-negative integer and let $A_n$ denote the number of solutions of the Diophantine equation
$$x + 5y + 10z + 25u + 50v = n$$
in non-negative integers. Then the series
$$A_0 + A_1 \zeta + A_2 \zeta^2 + \cdots + A_n\zeta^n +  \cdots$$
represents a rational function of $\zeta$. Find it.

3. In how many ways can you put the necessary stamps in one row on an airmail letter sent inside the U.S., using 2, 4, 6, 8 cent stamps? The postage is 10 cents. (Different arrangements of the same values are regarded as different ways.)

The first question sets up an elementary combinatorics question; but the second suggests both a solution (using generating functions) and a generalisation. The third gives another combinatorics question which can be solved by means of generating functions. Indeed, questions 1-26 follow generating function through further examples. Whole areas of mathematics are developed in this way.

Substantial additions were made in the English translation (published in 1972 and 1976), including new sections and back-references to Pólya's other works on problem solving.

== Reception ==
Richard Askey and Paul Nevai wrote of the book that, "there is a general consensus among mathematicians that the two-volume Pólya-Szegő is the best written and most useful problem book in the history of mathematics." The book has had its admirers. Various eminent mathematicians (Bernays, Courant, Fejér, E. Landau, F. Riesz, Toeplitz) had read over the galley proofs while the work was in press and its early reviewers (F. Riesz again, Knopp, Tamarkin), not much less eminent, were all effusive in their praise. The careful pedagogy meant that graduate students were able to learn analysis from Problems and Theorems alone. Paul Erdős once approached a young mathematician with a problem taken from volume II and announced "I will give $10 to China if you can solve this problem in ten minutes".

A Russian translation was published in 1937–38. An English translation was published in 1972–76.
