= List of things named after George Pólya =

These are things named after George Pólya (1887–1985), a Hungarian-American mathematician.

== Probability and statistics ==
- Pólya urn model – A self-reinforcing random process
  - Dirichlet process § The Pólya urn scheme – A modification
- Pólya distribution – Negative binomial distribution
  - Multivariate Pólya distribution – Compound multinomial distribution
- Pólya–Aeppli distribution – Special case of the compound Poisson distribution
- Pólya's characterization theorem – Statistical property of the normal distribution

== Complex analysis ==
- Pólya class – Entire functions with certain properties
  - Laguerre–Pólya class – A special case
- Pólya–Carlson theorem – On power series with integer coefficients
- Pólya theorem – On growth of an entire function and singularities of its Laplace transform
- Fatou–Hurwitz–Pólya theorem – On sign changes inside power series and natural boundaries
- Pólya's shire theorem – Relating the poles and derivatives of meromorphic functions
- Pólya's gap theorem – On the singularities of power series with gaps

== Number theory ==
- Hilbert–Pólya conjecture – About the Riemann zeta function
- Pólya–Vinogradov inequality – Inequality on character sums
- Pólya conjecture – Disproven statement about prime factors
- Fueter–Pólya theorem – On quadratic pairing functions
- Jordan–Pólya number – The product of factorials

== Combinatorics ==
- Pólya enumeration theorem – Generalizes Burnside's lemma on the number of orbits of a group action

== Inequalities ==
- Pólya–Szegő inequality – Involving symmetric functions in a Sobolev space
- Pólya inequality – A bound involving polynomials

== Awards and prizes ==
- George Pólya Prize – awarded by the Society for Industrial and Applied Mathematics
- Pólya Prize – awarded by the London Mathematical Society
- George Pólya Award – awarded by the Mathematical Association of America
