= Generis =

Generis may refer to:

- Generis (typeface)
- Generis, a fictional planet in the Star Wars franchise

== See also ==
- Generic (disambiguation)
- Papal encyclicals
  - Humani generis, a papal encyclical that Pope Pius XII promulgated on 12 August 1950
  - Humani generis redemptionem, a papal encyclical written by Pope Benedict XV and published on June 19, 1917
  - Humani generis unitas (Latin for On the Unity of the Human Race), a planned encyclical of Pope Pius XI before his death
- Sui Generis (disambiguation)
- Genus (Latin genitive generis)
