= Pólya =

Pólya (Hungarian for "swaddling clothes") is a surname. Notable people with the surname include:

- Eugen Alexander Pólya (1876–1944), Hungarian surgeon, elder brother of George Pólya
  - Reichel-Polya Operation, a type of partial gastrectomy developed by Eugen Pólya and Friedrich Paul Reichel
- George Pólya (1887–1985), Hungarian mathematician
  - List of things named after George Pólya
- Tibor Pólya (1886–1937), Hungarian graphic artist

== See also ==
- polyA, characteristic terminal sequence of mRNA
