= Problem book =

Textbook that uses problems as a means of teaching

Problem books are textbooks, usually at advanced undergraduate or post-graduate level, in which the material is organized as a series of problems, each with a complete solution given. Problem books are distinct from workbooks in that the problems are designed as a primary means of teaching, not merely for practice on material learned elsewhere. Problem books are found most often in the mathematical and physical sciences; they have a strong tradition within the Russian educational system.

At some American universities, problem books are associated with departmental preliminary or candidacy examinations for the Ph.D. degree. Such books may exemplify decades of actual examinations and, when published, are studied by graduate students at other institutions. Other problem books are specific to graduate fields of study. While certain problem books are collected, written, or edited by worthy but little-known toilers, others are done by renowned scholars and researchers.

The casebook for law and other non-technical fields can provide a similar function.

== Notable problem books in mathematics ==
- George Pólya and Gábor Szegő (1925) Problems and Theorems in Analysis (German: Aufgaben und Lehrsätze aus der Analysis)
- Paul Halmos (1982) A Hilbert Space Problem Book (ISBN 978-0387906850)
- Frederick Mosteller (1965,1987) Fifty Challenging Problems in Probability with Solutions (ISBN 978-0486653556)
- Arthur Engel (1997) Problem-Solving Strategies (ISBN 978-0387982199)

== Notable problem books in physics ==
- V. V. Batygin and I. N. Toptygin (1964,1978) Problems in Electrodynamics (ASIN B003X6BPSE)
- I. E. Irodov (1981) Problems in General Physics (ISBN 5-03-000800-4)
- Kyriakos Tamvakis (2005) Problems and Solutions in Quantum Mechanics (ISBN 978-0521600576)
- A.P. Lightman, W.H. Press, R.H. Price, and S.A. Teukolsky (1979) Problem Book in Relativity and Gravitation (ISBN 978-0691081625)
- W-H. Steeb (2006) Problems And Solutions in Quantum Computing And Quantum Information (ISBN 978-9812567406)

== Notable problem books in physics based on candidacy examinations ==
- J.A. Cronin, D.F. Greenberg, and V.L. Telegdi (1967,1979) University of Chicago Graduate Problems in Physics with Solutions (ISBN 978-0226121093)
- Nathan Newbury, John Ruhl, Suzanne Staggs, Stephen Thorsett, and Michael Newman. (1991) Princeton Problems in Physics with Solutions (ISBN 978-0691024493)
