= How to Solve It =

1945 book on problem solving by George Pólya

How to Solve It: A New Aspect of Mathematical Method
- Cover of first edition
- Author: George Pólya
- Genre: Mathematics, problem solving
- Publisher: Princeton University Press
- Publication date: 1945
- Media type: hardcover, paperback
- Pages: 204
- Followed by: Mathematics and Plausible Reasoning (1954)

How to Solve It is a guide to problem solving by mathematician George Pólya. Originally published by Princeton University Press in 1945, a second edition was released by Doubleday in 1957, and the book has been reissued several times since. In the preface to the first edition, Pólya said he wrote the book primarily for teachers and students of mathematics, and the examples are taken from elementary algebra and geometry. However, How to Solve It was later embraced by other disciplines for its clear explanations of heuristics and problem-solving strategies such as induction, analogy, specialization, and working backwards. The book has been translated into more than 15 languages and sold over a million copies, "making it one of the most widely circulated mathematics books in history."

== Four phases ==
Pólya begins with a two-page checklist that identifies four phases to solving a mathematical problem:

1. Understand the problem.
2. Make a plan.
3. Carry out the plan.
4. Look back.

He emphasizes that the divisions between phases are not rigid, and it is important to be flexible in one's approach:

Trying to find the solution, we may repeatedly change our point of view, our way of looking at the problem. We have to shift our position again and again. Our conception of the problem is likely to be rather incomplete when we start the work; our outlook is different when we have made some progress; it is again different when we have almost obtained the solution.

=== First phase: Understand the problem ===
Pólya writes that students are often stymied in their efforts to solve a problem simply because they do not understand it fully. To address this situation, he recommends that the teacher prompt students with a series of questions which will lead them to a deeper grasp of the problem. He says the key initial questions to ask are: "What is the unknown?", "What are the data?", and "What is the condition?" (meaning, "By what condition is the unknown linked to the data?").

Other suggested questions include:

- Do you understand all the words in the verbal statement of the problem?
- Can you restate the problem in your own words?
- Can you draw a figure that illustrates the unknown and the data?
- Is it a reasonable problem, i.e., is the condition sufficient to determine the unknown?

=== Second phase: Devise a plan ===
Pólya considers this the most important and challenging phase, acknowledging that the process of devising a workable plan "may be long and tortuous":

[T]he main achievement in the solution of a problem is to conceive the idea of a plan. This idea may emerge gradually. Or, after apparently unsuccessful trials and a period of hesitation, it may occur suddenly, in a flash, as a "bright idea". The best that the teacher can do for the student is to procure for him, by unobtrusive help, a bright idea.

The bulk of the book is devoted to offering suggestions to stimulate such an idea. Among the listed suggestions (and these are covered in more detail in the book's heuristics dictionary) are:

- Guess and test
- Solve a related but simpler problem
- Use symmetry, i.e., look for interchangeable parts in the problem
- Use a model
- Look for a pattern
- Examine special cases
- Work backwards
- Be creative

Pólya adds that applying these suggestions requires skill and judgment, which is best learned by solving many problems. He emphasizes the role of the teacher who should pose questions that help students devise plans. Pólya differentiates between asking a thought-provoking question such as "Do you know a related problem?" versus asking a leading question such as "Could you apply the theorem of Pythagoras?" In his view, the latter question, though well-intentioned, is not instructive because the student does not know how the teacher arrived at it.

=== Third phase: Carry out the plan ===
Pólya regards this phase as markedly easier than devising a plan. What is mainly needed is patience:

The plan gives a general outline; we have to convince ourselves that the details fit into the outline, and so we have to examine the details one after the other, patiently, till everything is perfectly clear, and no obscure corner remains in which an error could be hidden.

=== Fourth phase: Look back ===
After students solve a problem, Pólya urges them to pause and examine the result and the process which led to it. First, check the answer to ensure it makes sense in the context of the problem. Does the solution use all the data that was given? Students should explore whether an alternative strategy might have been used. They should verify the solution by double-checking their calculations and reasoning.

Pólya also advocates taking time to reflect on what was done, what worked and what did not, what could have been done better, and other problems where this solution might be useful. Doing so will enable the student to choose an appropriate strategy for future problems that resemble the current one.

== Heuristics dictionary ==
The book's largest section consists of a heuristics dictionary. It contains 67 entries with suggestions "for making progress on difficult problems". Many suggestions are aimed at finding a more accessible, related problem when a student is struggling to solve the original problem. For example:

Heuristic	Informal Description
Analogy	Can you find a problem analogous to your problem and solve that?
Auxiliary elements	Can you add some new element to your problem to get closer to a solution?
Auxiliary problem	Can you find a subproblem or side problem whose solution will help you solve your problem?
Decomposing and recombining	Can you decompose the problem and "recombine its elements in some new manner"?
Draw a figure	Can you draw a picture of the problem?
Generalization	Can you find a problem more general than your problem?
Here is a problem related to yours and solved before	Can you find a problem related to yours that has already been solved and use that to solve your problem?
Induction and mathematical induction	Can you solve your problem by deriving a generalization from some examples?
Reductio ad absurdum and indirect proof	Can you show the falsity of an assumption by deriving from it a manifest absurdity? Conversely, can you prove the truth of an assertion by showing the falsity of the opposite assumption?
Specialization	Can you find a problem more specialized? For instance, what if the given value was zero, would that shed light on the problem?
Variation of the problem	Can you vary or change your problem to create a new problem (or set of problems) whose solution(s) will help you solve your original problem?
Working backwards	Can you start with the goal and work backwards to something you already know?

== Reception ==
Pólya's book was praised for its usefulness in mathematics education and in education more broadly. The Mathematical Gazette said the book was "primarily for students and teachers of mathematics, but it might interest any educated teacher of any subject which does not consist in the mere accumulation of knowledge. Its appeal would perhaps be greatest at the Training College level, and although it contains very little that a good teacher would not discover for himself, it might very well accelerate the process of discovery." E. T. Bell labeled the book "an instructive exposition of the heuristic method applied to the solution of problems in elementary mathematics.... If heuristic is no longer taught, How to Solve It may supply the deficiency. Every prospective teacher should read it." In a thumbnail review in the Chicago Tribune, How to Solve It was called "a disarmingly elementary book on the solution of problems. Largely illustrated by mathematics, but method is applicable in principle to problems in science, engineering, or social work. Of great value to every one."

In American Journal of Psychology, A. C. Schaeffer wrote:

Instead of allowing the student to search blindly and without a plan or method, Pólya shows how he may be led quite naturally to a solution through the kind of heuristic procedure which he found in a hint given by the Greek mathematician Pappus (ca. 300 A.D.), a hint which has served to solve, as the author says, many difficult and baffling problems. The work may be read with profit by students and researchers in mathematics and in some of the physical sciences. In fact, any young person seeking a career in the sciences would do well to ponder this important contribution to the teacher's art.

== Influence ==
Mathematics Professor Alan H. Schoenfeld wrote in 1987 that the increased interest at the time in the area of problem solving, and in finding ways to teach it effectively, owed a big debt to How to Solve It. He pointed out that in the prior five years alone, the book had been cited in journals as diverse as American Political Science Review, Annual Review of Psychology, Artificial Intelligence, Computers and Chemistry, Computers and Education, Discourse Processes, Educational Leadership, Higher Education, and Human Learning.

But not all were convinced of the practical benefits of Pólya's heuristic strategies. Schoenfeld did not consider the strategies sufficient for his undergraduate math students working on non-routine problems. He argued that domain-specific knowledge and "mathematical sophistication" were also essential. From his observations of students attempting to utilize How to Solve It, Schoenfeld noticed they were often confused as to which among the dozens of Pólya's heuristic strategies should be chosen for a particular problem.

AI pioneers Allen Newell and Marvin Minsky praised Pólya for reviving the field of heuristics. In his 1960 paper, "Steps Toward Artificial Intelligence", Minsky wrote that "everyone should know the work of George Pólya on how to solve problems."

In the 1960s and '70s, Soviet engineer Genrich Altshuller developed a methodology, known as the Theory of Inventive Problem Solving (or TRIZ from the Russian abbreviation), which in many aspects paralleled Pólya's work but was more oriented toward solving engineering problems.

How to Solve It became a valued debugging guide for computer programmers. In 1982, R. G. Dromey wrote How to Solve it by Computer, a computer science textbook dedicated to and inspired by Pólya. In his Preface, Dromey stated, "there was a definite need for a book written in the spirit of Pólya's work, but translated into the computing science context." In a 1980s interview at Microsoft, Charles Simonyi said that "Programmers get a couple of books on their first day here. One of them, called How to Solve It, is by George Pólya, the mathematician. [Simonyi takes the book from a bookcase next to his desk and opens it to a certain page.] These two pages are important [note: he's referring to the two-page checklist at the start of the book]. The rest of the book just elaborates on these two pages. This is like a checklist for problem solving."

== See also ==
- Inventor's paradox
