= Mohmil =

Mohmil (Hindi: मुहमिल, मोहमिल, romanized: muhmil, mōhmil; Punjabi: ਮੁਹਮਿਲ (Gurmukhi), مہمل (Shahmukhi), romanized: muhmil; Urdu: مہمل, romanized: muhmil) is the name given to meaningless words in Hindustani (Hindi-Urdu), Punjabi, Sindhi, and other Indo-Aryan languages, used mostly for generalization purposes. The mohmil word usually directly follows (but sometimes precedes) the meaningful word that is generalized. The mohmil word usually rhymes with the meaningful word, or shares the same consonants.

Some common examples of mohmil words:

- Gol mol
- Theek thaak
- Khaana vaana
- Kursi vursi
- Dhoom dhaam
- Roti shoti
- Chup chaap

== See also ==
- Placeholder name
