= How to Solve it by Computer =

1982 book by R. G. Dromey

- Language: English
- Publisher: Prentice Hall
- Publication date: July 1, 1982
- Pages: 442
- ISBN: 978-0134340012

How to Solve it by Computer is a computer science book by R. G. Dromey, first published by Prentice-Hall in 1982. It is occasionally used as a textbook, especially in India.

It is an introduction to the whys of algorithms and data structures. Features of the book:

1. The design factors associated with problems,
2. The creative process behind coming up with innovative solutions for algorithms and data structures,
3. The line of reasoning behind the constraints, factors and the design choices made.

The very fundamental algorithms portrayed by this book are mostly presented in pseudocode and/or Pascal notation.

== See also ==
- How to Solve It, by George Pólya, the author's mentor and inspiration for writing the book.
