= Aeppli =

Aeppli is a surname. Notable people with the surname include:

- Alfred Aeppli (1894–?), Swiss mathematician
- Eva Aeppli (1925–2015), Swiss artist
- Fritz Aeppli, Swiss footballer
- Gabriel Aeppli (born 1956), Swiss-American physicist, son of Alfred
