= Bott–Chern cohomology =

Cohomology theory for complex manifolds

In mathematics, Bott–Chern cohomology is a cohomology theory associated with the double complex of differential forms on a complex manifold. Introduced by Raoul Bott and Shiing-Shen Chern in 1965, it provides a refinement of the relationship between de Rham cohomology and Dolbeault cohomology, particularly for complex manifolds that are not Kähler.

Unlike de Rham cohomology, which is defined using the exterior derivative, or Dolbeault cohomology, which is defined using one of the Dolbeault operators, Bott–Chern cohomology simultaneously imposes closedness under both Dolbeault operators and takes the quotient by forms arising from their composition.

For a complex manifold $X$, the Bott–Chern cohomology groups are defined by

$$H_{BC}^{p,q}(X)
=
\frac{
\ker\partial\cap\ker\bar\partial
\subseteq A^{p,q}(X)
}{
\operatorname{im}(\partial\bar\partial:
A^{p-1,q-1}(X)\to A^{p,q}(X))
},$$

where $A^{p,q}(X)$ denotes the vector space of smooth complex-valued differential forms of bidegree $(p,q)$.

The theory admits canonical morphisms to de Rham and Dolbeault cohomology and to the related Aeppli cohomology. On compact complex manifolds, Bott–Chern and Aeppli cohomology provide invariants of the complex structure and are closely connected with the $\partial\bar\partial$-lemma.

== Differential forms on complex manifolds ==
Let $X$ be a complex manifold of complex dimension $n$. Its complexified cotangent bundle decomposes as

$$T^*X\otimes_{\mathbb R}\mathbb C
=
T^{*1,0}X\oplus T^{*0,1}X.$$

Consequently, the complexified exterior algebra decomposes into forms of bidegree $(p,q)$:

$$A^k(X,\mathbb C)
=
\bigoplus_{p+q=k}A^{p,q}(X).$$

The exterior derivative decomposes as $d = \partial + \bar \partial$, where

$$\partial:A^{p,q}(X)\to A^{p+1,q}(X)$$

and

$$\bar\partial:A^{p,q}(X)\to A^{p,q+1}(X).$$

The identity $d^2=0$ implies

$$\partial^2=0,
\qquad
\bar\partial^2=0,
\qquad
\partial\bar\partial+
\bar\partial\partial=0.$$

Thus the differential forms constitute a double complex.

=== The Dolbeault double complex ===
The decomposition can be represented by

$$\begin{array}{ccccc}
A^{0,2}&\xrightarrow{\partial}&A^{1,2}&\xrightarrow{\partial}&A^{2,2}\\
\uparrow\bar\partial&&\uparrow\bar\partial&&\uparrow\bar\partial\\
A^{0,1}&\xrightarrow{\partial}&A^{1,1}&\xrightarrow{\partial}&A^{2,1}\\
\uparrow\bar\partial&&\uparrow\bar\partial&&\uparrow\bar\partial\\
A^{0,0}&\xrightarrow{\partial}&A^{1,0}&\xrightarrow{\partial}&A^{2,0}.
\end{array}$$

The horizontal differential is $\partial$, while the vertical differential is $\bar\partial$. The two differentials anticommute, meaning that their compositions around an elementary square differ by a sign.

Bott–Chern cohomology is defined using the simultaneous kernels of these two differentials.

== Definition ==
Let $X$ be a complex manifold. For integers $p,q\geq 0$, define the space of Bott–Chern cocycles by

$$Z_{BC}^{p,q}(X)
=
\{\alpha\in A^{p,q}(X):
\partial\alpha=0,\
\bar\partial\alpha=0\},$$

and the space of Bott–Chern coboundaries by

$$B_{BC}^{p,q}(X)
=
\partial\bar\partial A^{p-1,q-1}(X).$$

The convention is that $A^{r,s}(X)=0$ whenever either index is negative. Since $\partial(\partial\bar\partial\beta)=0$ and

$$\bar\partial(\partial\bar\partial\beta)
=
-\partial\bar\partial^2\beta=0,$$

every Bott–Chern coboundary is a Bott–Chern cocycle. Therefore,

$$B_{BC}^{p,q}(X)\subseteq Z_{BC}^{p,q}(X).$$

The Bott–Chern cohomology group of bidegree $(p,q)$ is the quotient

$$H_{BC}^{p,q}(X)
=
Z_{BC}^{p,q}(X)/B_{BC}^{p,q}(X).$$

Equivalently,

$$H_{BC}^{p,q}(X)
=
\frac{
\{\alpha\in A^{p,q}(X):
\partial\alpha=\bar\partial\alpha=0\}
}{
\{\partial\bar\partial\beta:
\beta\in A^{p-1,q-1}(X)\}
}.$$

An element of $H_{BC}^{p,q}(X)$ is represented by a differential form closed under both Dolbeault operators, where two representatives are equivalent if their difference is $\partial\bar\partial$-exact.

== Fundamental properties ==
=== Simultaneous closedness ===
Proposition. Every Bott–Chern cocycle is closed under the exterior derivative.

Proof.

Let $\alpha\in Z_{BC}^{p,q}(X).$ By definition, $\partial\alpha=0$ and $\bar\partial\alpha=0$. Since $d=\partial+\bar\partial$, we have

$$d\alpha
=
\partial\alpha+\bar\partial\alpha
=0.$$

Therefore every Bott–Chern cocycle is de Rham closed.

The converse does not generally hold for an arbitrary differential form of mixed bidegree. However, if a differential form $\alpha$ has pure bidegree $(p,q)$ and satisfies $d\alpha=0$, then

$$\partial\alpha+\bar\partial\alpha=0.$$

The two terms have distinct bidegrees, namely $(p+1,q)$ and $(p,q+1)$. Consequently, each term vanishes separately: $\partial\alpha=0$ and $\bar\partial\alpha=0$. Thus, for forms of pure bidegree, Bott–Chern closedness is equivalent to de Rham closedness.

=== Complex conjugation ===
Complex conjugation exchanges forms of bidegree $(p,q)$ with forms of bidegree $(q,p)$.

For every $\alpha\in A^{p,q}(X)$,

$$\overline{\partial\alpha}
=
\bar\partial\overline\alpha,
\qquad
\overline{\bar\partial\alpha}
=
\partial\overline\alpha.$$

Consequently, conjugation induces an antilinear isomorphism $H_{BC}^{p,q}(X) \to H_{BC}^{q,p}(X)$. In particular, when these groups are finite-dimensional,

$$\dim_{\mathbb C}H_{BC}^{p,q}(X)
=
\dim_{\mathbb C}H_{BC}^{q,p}(X).$$

== Relationship with de Rham cohomology ==
The de Rham cohomology of a smooth manifold is defined by

$$H_{dR}^k(X,\mathbb C)
=
\frac{
\ker(d:A^k(X,\mathbb C)\to A^{k+1}(X,\mathbb C))
}{
\operatorname{im}(d:A^{k-1}(X,\mathbb C)\to A^k(X,\mathbb C))
}.$$

Every Bott–Chern cocycle is de Rham closed. Moreover, if $\alpha=\partial\bar\partial\beta$, then $\alpha=d(\bar\partial\beta)$, because $\bar\partial^2=0$. Therefore every Bott–Chern coboundary is de Rham exact.

This establishes a canonical homomorphism

$$\iota_{dR}^{p,q}:
H_{BC}^{p,q}(X)
\to
H_{dR}^{p+q}(X,\mathbb C)$$

defined by $\iota_{dR}^{p,q}([\alpha]_{BC}) = [\alpha]_{dR}$. The construction is well-defined because replacing $\alpha$ by a $\partial\bar\partial$-exact form does not change its de Rham cohomology class.

The map need not be injective or surjective on an arbitrary complex manifold.

== Relationship with Dolbeault cohomology ==
The Dolbeault cohomology groups are defined by

$$H_{\bar\partial}^{p,q}(X)
=
\frac{
\ker(\bar\partial:A^{p,q}(X)\to A^{p,q+1}(X))
}{
\operatorname{im}(\bar\partial:A^{p,q-1}(X)\to A^{p,q}(X))
}.$$

Similarly, one may define the conjugate Dolbeault cohomology groups

$$H_{\partial}^{p,q}(X)
=
\frac{
\ker(\partial:A^{p,q}(X)\to A^{p+1,q}(X))
}{
\operatorname{im}(\partial:A^{p-1,q}(X)\to A^{p,q}(X))
}.$$

Since a Bott–Chern cocycle is both $\partial$-closed and $\bar\partial$-closed, it defines classes in both cohomology theories. Furthermore, $\partial\bar\partial\beta = \bar\partial(-\partial\beta),$ so every Bott–Chern coboundary is also Dolbeault exact. Consequently, there are canonical maps

$$\iota_{\bar\partial}:
H_{BC}^{p,q}(X)
\to
H_{\bar\partial}^{p,q}(X)$$

and

$$\iota_{\partial}:
H_{BC}^{p,q}(X)
\to
H_{\partial}^{p,q}(X).$$

Both are induced by the identity on differential forms.

== Aeppli cohomology ==
A closely related theory is Aeppli cohomology.

For a complex manifold $X$, its Aeppli cohomology groups are defined by

$$H_A^{p,q}(X)
=
\frac{
\ker(\partial\bar\partial:
A^{p,q}(X)\to A^{p+1,q+1}(X))
}{
\partial A^{p-1,q}(X)
+
\bar\partial A^{p,q-1}(X)
}.$$

The quotient is well-defined because

$$\partial\bar\partial(\partial\beta)=0$$

and

$$\partial\bar\partial(\bar\partial\gamma)=0.$$

Thus

$$\operatorname{im}\partial+
\operatorname{im}\bar\partial
\subseteq
\ker(\partial\bar\partial).$$

The Bott–Chern and Aeppli constructions differ in the placement of the kernels and images.

For Bott–Chern cohomology,

$$H_{BC}^{p,q}(X)
=
\frac{\ker\partial\cap\ker\bar\partial}
{\operatorname{im}\partial\bar\partial}.$$

For Aeppli cohomology,

$$H_A^{p,q}(X)
=
\frac{\ker\partial\bar\partial}
{\operatorname{im}\partial+\operatorname{im}\bar\partial}.$$

Because every Bott–Chern cocycle is $\partial\bar\partial$-closed, there is a canonical map

$$H_{BC}^{p,q}(X)\longrightarrow H_A^{p,q}(X).$$

There are also canonical maps

$$H_{\bar\partial}^{p,q}(X)\longrightarrow H_A^{p,q}(X)$$

and

$$H_{\partial}^{p,q}(X)\longrightarrow H_A^{p,q}(X).$$

These maps are all induced by the identity on differential forms.

== Canonical maps and commutative diagrams ==
The canonical maps among Bott–Chern, Dolbeault, conjugate Dolbeault, and Aeppli cohomology form a commutative diagram:

$$\begin{array}{ccccc}
&&H_{BC}^{p,q}(X)&&\\
&\swarrow&&\searrow&\\
H_{\partial}^{p,q}(X)&&&&H_{\bar\partial}^{p,q}(X)\\
&\searrow&&\swarrow&\\
&&H_A^{p,q}(X).&&
\end{array}$$

The diagram commutes because every map is induced by the identity on representatives.

In particular, the two compositions

$$H_{BC}^{p,q}(X)
\longrightarrow
H_{\partial}^{p,q}(X)
\longrightarrow
H_A^{p,q}(X)$$

and

$$H_{BC}^{p,q}(X)
\longrightarrow
H_{\bar\partial}^{p,q}(X)
\longrightarrow
H_A^{p,q}(X)$$

agree with the direct canonical map

$$H_{BC}^{p,q}(X)\longrightarrow H_A^{p,q}(X).$$

The relationship with de Rham cohomology is given separately by

$$H_{BC}^{p,q}(X)
\longrightarrow
H_{dR}^{p+q}(X,\mathbb C).$$

In general, there is no canonical map from a single Dolbeault cohomology group to de Rham cohomology induced by inclusion of differential forms, since a $\bar\partial$-closed form need not be $d$-closed.

== The partial-partial-bar lemma ==
The $\partial\bar\partial$-lemma is a fundamental property of certain complex manifolds.

A complex manifold $X$ is said to satisfy the $\partial\bar\partial$-lemma if every differential form of pure bidegree that is $d$-closed and $d$-exact is also $\partial\bar\partial$-exact.

Equivalently, for every bidegree $(p,q)$,

$$\ker d\cap\operatorname{im}d
\cap A^{p,q}(X)
=
\operatorname{im}\partial\bar\partial
\cap A^{p,q}(X).$$

The reverse inclusion always holds, since

$$\partial\bar\partial\beta
=
d(\bar\partial\beta).$$

Thus the substantive assertion is that every de Rham exact, de Rham closed form of pure bidegree admits a $\partial\bar\partial$-potential.

=== Injectivity of the Bott–Chern map ===
Proposition. If $X$ satisfies the $\partial\bar\partial$-lemma, then the canonical map

$$H_{BC}^{p,q}(X)
\longrightarrow
H_{dR}^{p+q}(X,\mathbb C)$$

is injective for every $p,q$.

Proof.

Suppose

$$[\alpha]_{BC}\in H_{BC}^{p,q}(X)$$

maps to zero in de Rham cohomology.

Then

$$[\alpha]_{dR}=0,$$

so there exists a differential form $\gamma$ such that

$$\alpha=d\gamma.$$

Because $\alpha$ represents a Bott–Chern class,

$$\partial\alpha=0,
\qquad
\bar\partial\alpha=0.$$

Therefore $\alpha$ is a de Rham exact, de Rham closed form of pure bidegree.

By the $\partial\bar\partial$-lemma, there exists

$$\beta\in A^{p-1,q-1}(X)$$

such that

$$\alpha=\partial\bar\partial\beta.$$

Hence

$$[\alpha]_{BC}=0.$$

The kernel of the canonical map is therefore trivial, proving injectivity.

=== Kähler manifolds ===
Every compact Kähler manifold satisfies the $\partial\bar\partial$-lemma.

Consequently, on a compact Kähler manifold, Bott–Chern cohomology agrees with Dolbeault cohomology through the canonical maps:

$$H_{BC}^{p,q}(X)
\cong
H_{\bar\partial}^{p,q}(X).$$

Similarly,

$$H_{BC}^{p,q}(X)
\cong
H_{\partial}^{p,q}(X)
\cong
H_A^{p,q}(X).$$

The Hodge decomposition gives

$$H_{dR}^{k}(X,\mathbb C)
\cong
\bigoplus_{p+q=k}H_{\bar\partial}^{p,q}(X).$$

Combining these identifications yields

$$H_{dR}^{k}(X,\mathbb C)
\cong
\bigoplus_{p+q=k}H_{BC}^{p,q}(X).$$

This isomorphism is induced by summing the canonical maps from Bott–Chern cohomology to de Rham cohomology.

== Bott–Chern cohomology and Hermitian geometry ==
Let $X$ be a complex manifold equipped with a Hermitian metric.

The associated fundamental form is a real differential form of type $(1,1)$, commonly denoted by $\omega$.

For a Kähler metric,

$$d\omega=0.$$

Consequently,

$$\partial\omega=0,
\qquad
\bar\partial\omega=0.$$

Thus the fundamental form defines a Bott–Chern class

$$[\omega]_{BC}\in H_{BC}^{1,1}(X).$$

For a general Hermitian metric, the fundamental form need not be closed and therefore need not determine a Bott–Chern cohomology class.

Nevertheless, Bott–Chern and Aeppli cohomology are important tools in the study of non-Kähler Hermitian structures.

== Bott–Chern characteristic classes ==
Bott–Chern cohomology also provides a natural setting for characteristic classes of holomorphic vector bundles.

Let $E\to X$ be a holomorphic vector bundle equipped with a Hermitian metric.

Its Chern connection has curvature

$$F_E\in A^{1,1}(X,\operatorname{End}E).$$

The Chern–Weil construction produces closed differential forms representing the Chern classes of $E$.

For example, the first Chern form is

$$c_1(E,h)
=
\frac{\sqrt{-1}}{2\pi}
\operatorname{Tr}(F_E),$$

with the convention that the curvature is defined by the usual Chern connection.

The form is of type $(1,1)$ and is $d$-closed.

Therefore it defines a Bott–Chern cohomology class

$$c_1^{BC}(E)\in H_{BC}^{1,1}(X).$$

The class is independent of the choice of Hermitian metric.

Indeed, the difference between the first Chern forms obtained from two Hermitian metrics is $\partial\bar\partial$-exact, up to the conventional scalar factor.

More generally, Chern–Weil representatives of higher Chern classes define classes

$$c_k^{BC}(E)\in H_{BC}^{k,k}(X).$$

These refine the corresponding de Rham characteristic classes.

== Finite-dimensionality and elliptic theory ==
For a compact complex manifold, Bott–Chern cohomology groups are finite-dimensional.

This follows from the existence of an elliptic differential operator whose kernel represents Bott–Chern cohomology.

Given a Hermitian metric on a compact complex manifold, one can construct a self-adjoint fourth-order elliptic operator, commonly called the Bott–Chern Laplacian.

Its kernel is naturally isomorphic to the corresponding Bott–Chern cohomology group:

$$H_{BC}^{p,q}(X)
\cong
\ker\Delta_{BC}\cap A^{p,q}(X).$$

The ellipticity of this operator implies that its kernel is finite-dimensional on a compact manifold.

The resulting dimensions

$$h_{BC}^{p,q}(X)
=
\dim_{\mathbb C}H_{BC}^{p,q}(X)$$

are called the Bott–Chern numbers.

Similarly, the Aeppli numbers are defined by

$$h_A^{p,q}(X)
=
\dim_{\mathbb C}H_A^{p,q}(X).$$

For a compact complex manifold of complex dimension $n$, elliptic duality gives

$$h_{BC}^{p,q}(X)
=
h_A^{n-q,n-p}(X).$$

This relationship reflects the duality between Bott–Chern and Aeppli cohomology.

== Examples ==
=== Complex projective space ===
Let

$$X=\mathbb{CP}^{n}.$$

Since complex projective space is compact and Kähler, it satisfies the $\partial\bar\partial$-lemma.

Its Bott–Chern cohomology is therefore identified with its Dolbeault cohomology.

The only nonzero groups occur when $p=q$:

$$H_{BC}^{p,q}(\mathbb{CP}^{n})
\cong
\begin{cases}
\mathbb C,&p=q,\ 0\leq p\leq n,\\
0,&p\neq q.
\end{cases}$$

The generator of

$$H_{BC}^{1,1}(\mathbb{CP}^{n})$$

may be represented by the Fubini–Study form.

Its exterior powers generate the diagonal Bott–Chern groups.

=== Compact complex tori ===
Let

$$X=\mathbb C^n/\Lambda,$$

where $\Lambda$ is a lattice of rank $2n$.

Every complex torus admits a flat Kähler metric.

Therefore,

$$H_{BC}^{p,q}(X)
\cong
H_{\bar\partial}^{p,q}(X).$$

The dimensions are

$$h_{BC}^{p,q}(X)
=
\binom np\binom nq.$$

These groups are represented by translation-invariant differential forms of type $(p,q)$.

=== Non-Kähler manifolds ===
On a non-Kähler complex manifold, the Bott–Chern groups need not coincide with Dolbeault or de Rham cohomology.

An important example is the Iwasawa manifold, a compact complex threefold obtained as a quotient of the complex Heisenberg group by a cocompact lattice.

The manifold is complex parallelizable but does not satisfy the $\partial\bar\partial$-lemma.

Its Bott–Chern cohomology can be computed using suitable invariant differential forms.

Such examples demonstrate that Bott–Chern cohomology detects aspects of complex geometry that are not determined solely by de Rham cohomology.

== See also ==
- Aeppli cohomology
- Dolbeault cohomology
- De Rham cohomology
- Hodge theory
- Kähler manifold
- Hermitian manifold
- Complex manifold
- Chern class
- Frölicher spectral sequence
- Double complex
- Angella, Daniele (2015). "On the Bott-Chern and Aeppli cohomology". arXiv:1507.07112 [math.CV].
- Angella, Daniele; Tomassini, Adriano (2013). "On the $\partial\bar\partial$-Lemma and Bott-Chern Cohomology". Inventiones Mathematicae. 192 (1): 71–81. arXiv:1402.1954. doi:10.1007/s00222-012-0406-3.
- Angella, Daniele; Tomassini, Adriano (2015). "On Bott-Chern cohomology and formality". Journal of Geometry and Physics. 93: 52–61. arXiv:1411.6037. Bibcode:2015JGP....93...52A. doi:10.1016/j.geomphys.2015.03.004.
- Bott, Raoul; Chern, S. S. (1965). "Hermitian vector bundles and the equidistribution of the zeroes of their holomorphic sections". Acta Mathematica. 114: 71–112. doi:10.1007/BF02391818.
- Schweitzer, Michel (2007). "Autour de la cohomologie de Bott-Chern" (in French). arXiv:0709.3528 [math.AG].
- Wells, Raymond O., Jr. (2008) [1973]. Differential Analysis on Complex Manifolds. Graduate Texts in Mathematics. Vol. 65 (3rd ed.). New York: Springer. ISBN 978-0-387-73891-8.
