= Aeppli cohomology =

Cohomology theory for complex manifolds

In complex geometry in mathematics, Aeppli cohomology is a cohomology theory for complex manifolds. It serves as a bridge between de Rham cohomology, which is defined for real manifolds which in particular underlie complex manifolds, and Dobeault cohomology, which is its analogue for complex manifolds. A direct comparison between these cohomology theories through canonical maps is not possible, but both canonically map into Aeppli cohomology. A similar cohomology theory, which maps into both and which hence also serves as a bridge is Bott–Chern cohomology. Aeppli cohomology is named after Alfred Aeppli (1928–2008), who introduced it in 1964.

== Definition ==
For a complex manifold $X$, its Aeppli cohomology is given by:

$$H_\mathrm{A}^{p,q}(X)
:=\ker(\partial_{p,q}\overline\partial_{p,q})/(\operatorname{img}(\partial_{p-1,q})+\operatorname{img}(\partial_{p,q-1})).$$

$\partial$ and $\overline\partial$ denote the Dobeault operators.

== Maps ==
de Rham and Dobeault cohomology are given by:

$$H_\mathrm{dR}^n(X)
:=\ker(\mathrm{d}_n)/\operatorname{img}(\mathrm{d}_{n-1}),$$
$$H_\partial^{p,q}(X)
:=\ker(\partial_{p,q})/\operatorname{img}(\partial_{p-1,q}),$$
$$H_\overline\partial^{p,q}(X)
:=\ker(\overline\partial_{p,q})/\operatorname{img}(\overline\partial_{p,q-1}).$$

Since there are canonical inclusions $\ker(\mathrm{d}_{p+q})\hookrightarrow\ker(\overline\partial_{p+1,q}\partial_{p,q}) =\ker(\partial_{p,q+1}\overline\partial_{p,q})$ and $\operatorname{img}(\partial_{p-1,q})+\operatorname{img}(\partial_{p,q-1})\hookrightarrow\operatorname{img}(\mathrm{d}_{p+q-1})$, there is a canonical inclusion of de Rham into Aeppli cohomology:

$$H_\mathrm{dR}^{p+q}(X)\rightarrow H_\mathrm{A}^{p,q}(X).$$

Since there are canonical inclusions $\operatorname{img}(\partial_{p-1,q}),\operatorname{img}(\overline\partial_{p,q-1})\hookrightarrow\operatorname{img}(\partial_{p-1,q})+\operatorname{img}(\partial_{p,q-1})$ as well as $\ker(\partial_{p,q})\hookrightarrow\ker(\overline\partial_{p+1,q}\partial_{p,q})$ and $\ker(\overline\partial_{p,q})\hookrightarrow\ker(\partial_{p,q+1}\overline\partial_{p,q})$, there are canonical maps from Dobeault into Aeppli cohomology:

$$H_\partial^{p,q}(X)\rightarrow H_\mathrm{A}^{p,q}(X),$$
$$H_\overline\partial^{p,q}(X)\rightarrow H_\mathrm{A}^{p,q}(X).$$

Furthermore there are canonical maps $H_\mathrm{BC}^{p,q}(X)\rightarrow H_\mathrm{dR}^n(X),H_\partial^{p,q}(X),H_{\overline\partial}^{p,q}(X)$ from Bott–Chern cohomology, with all three compositions $H_\mathrm{BC}^{p,q}(X)\rightarrow H_\mathrm{A}^{p,q}(X)$ being identical.

== Literature ==
- Aeppli, Alfred (1964). "On the Cohomology Structure of Stein Manifolds". Proceedings of the Conference on Complex Analysis. Vol. 114. Springer, Berlin, Heidelberg. pp. 58–70. doi:10.1007/978-3-642-48016-4_7. ISBN 978-3-642-48016-4.
- Angella, Daniele; Tomassini, Adriano (2014-11-21). "On Bott-Chern cohomology and formality". Journal of Geometry and Physics. 93: 52. arXiv:1411.6037. Bibcode:2015JGP....93...52A. doi:10.1016/j.geomphys.2015.03.004.
- Angella, Daniele (2015-07-25). "On the Bott-Chern and Aeppli cohomology". arXiv:1507.07112 [math.CV].
