= Generic name =

Generic name may refer to:

- Generic name (biology), the name of a biological genus
- Placeholder name, words that can refer to objects or people whose names are temporarily forgotten, irrelevant, or unknown

== Business and law ==
- Generic brand, consumer products identified by product characteristics rather than brand name
- Generic term, a common name used for a range or class of similar things not protected by trademark
- Generic trademark, a brand name that has become the generic name for a product or service
- Generic name (pharmaceuticals), a nonproprietary name used as an identifier for pharmaceuticals. Naming systems include:
  - International Nonproprietary Name (INN)
  - United States Adopted Name (USAN)
  - Japanese Accepted Name (JAN)
  - British Approved Name (BAN)

== See also ==
- Generic drug, a drug that contains the same substance as a previously patented drug
- Colloquial name, a name or term commonly used to identify something in informal language
- Generic (disambiguation)
- Common name (disambiguation)
