= Hermite class =

In mathematics, the Hermite or Pólya class is a set of entire functions satisfying the requirement that if E(z) is in the class, then:

1. E(z) has no zero (root) in the upper half-plane.
2. $|E(x+iy)|\ge|E(x-iy)|$ for x and y real and y positive.
3. $|E(x+iy)|$ is a non-decreasing function of y for positive y.

The first condition (no root in the upper half plane) can be derived from the third plus a condition that the function not be identically zero. The second condition is not implied by the third, as demonstrated by the function $\exp(-iz+e^{iz}).$ In at least one publication of Louis de Branges, the second condition is replaced by a strict inequality, which modifies some of the properties given below.

Every entire function of Hermite class can be expressed as the limit of a series of polynomials having no zeros in the upper half-plane.

The product of two functions of Hermite class is also of Hermite class, so the class constitutes a monoid under the operation of multiplication of functions.

The class arises from investigations by Georg Pólya in 1913 but some prefer to call it the Hermite class after Charles Hermite. A de Branges space can be defined on the basis of some "Weight function" of Hermite class, but with the additional stipulation that the inequality be strict – that is, $|E(x+iy)|>|E(x-iy)|$ for positive y. (However, a de Branges space can be defined using a function that is not in the class, such as exp(z^{2}−iz).)

The Hermite class is a subset of the Hermite–Biehler class, which does not include the third of the above three requirements.

A function with no roots in the upper half plane is of Hermite class if and only if two conditions are met: that the nonzero roots z_{n} satisfy

$$\sum_n\frac{1-\operatorname{Im} z_n}{|z_n|^2}<\infty$$

(with roots counted according to their multiplicity), and that the function can be expressed in the form of a Hadamard product

$$z^m e^{a+bz+cz^2}\prod_n \left(1-z/z_n\right)\exp(z\operatorname{Re}\frac{1}{z_n})$$

with c real and non-positive and Im b non-positive. (The non-negative integer m will be positive if E(0)=0. Even if the number of roots is infinite, the infinite product is well defined and converges.) From this we can see that if a function f(z) of Hermite class has a root at w, then $f(z)/(z-w)$ will also be of Hermite class.

Assume f(z) is a non-constant polynomial of Hermite class. If its derivative is zero at some point w in the upper half-plane, then

$$|f(z)|\sim|f(w)+a(z-w)^n|$$

near w for some complex number a and some integer n greater than 1. But this would imply that $|f(x+iy)|$ decreases with y somewhere in any neighborhood of w, which cannot be the case. So the derivative is a polynomial with no root in the upper half-plane, that is, of Hermite class. Since a non-constant function of Hermite class is the limit of a sequence of such polynomials, its derivative will be of Hermite class as well.

Louis de Branges showed a connexion between functions of Hermite class and analytic functions whose imaginary part is non-negative in the upper half-plane (UHP), often called Nevanlinna functions. If a function E(z) is of Hermite-Biehler class and E(0) = 1, we can take the logarithm of E in such a way that it is analytic in the UHP and such that log(E(0)) = 0. Then E(z) is of Hermite class if and only if

$$\text{Im}\frac{-\log(E(z))}z\ge 0$$

(in the UHP).

== Laguerre–Pólya class ==
A smaller class of entire functions is the Laguerre–Pólya class, which consists of those functions which are locally the limit of a series of polynomials whose roots are all real. Any function of Laguerre–Pólya class is also of Hermite class. Some examples are $\sin(z), \cos(z), \exp(z), \text{ and }\exp(-z^2).$

== Examples ==
From the Hadamard form it is easy to create examples of functions of Hermite class. Some examples are:

- A non-zero constant.
- $z$
- Polynomials having no roots in the upper half plane, such as $z+i$
- $\exp(-piz)$ if and only if Re(p) is non-negative
- $\exp(-pz^2)$ if and only if p is a non-negative real number
- any function of Laguerre-Pólya class: $\sin(z), \cos(z), \exp(z), \exp(-z), \exp(-z^2).$
- A product of functions of Hermite class
