= Common name (disambiguation) =

A common name, in the nomenclature of biology, is a name of a taxon or organism based on the normal language of everyday life.

Common name may also refer to:

- Common name (chemistry) (a.k.a. trivial name), non-systematic name for a chemical
- Common noun in linguistics, noun that refers to a class of entities rather than a unique entity
- CN (or "common name") in cryptography, part of an X.509 attribute certificate
- A human name used frequently; see also: list of most popular given names

== See also ==
- Generic name (disambiguation)
