= Pólya's shire theorem =

Theorem in complex analysis

Pólya's shire theorem, named after George Pólya, is a theorem in complex analysis that describes the asymptotic distribution of the zeros of successive derivatives of a meromorphic function on the complex plane. It has applications in Nevanlinna theory.

== Statement ==
Let $f$ be a meromorphic function on the complex plane with $P \neq \emptyset$ as its set of poles. If $E$ is the set of all zeros of all the successive derivatives $f', f'', f^{(3)}, \ldots$, then the derived set $E'$ (or the set of all limit points) is as follows:

1. if $f$ has only one pole, then $E'$ is empty.
2. if $|P| \geq 2$, then $E'$ coincides with the edges of the Voronoi diagram determined by the set of poles $P$. In this case, if $a \in P$, the interior of each Voronoi cell consisting of the points closest to $a$ than any other point in $P$ is called the $a$-shire.

The derived set is independent of the order of each pole.

In the special case of a rational function $f$ with at least two distinct poles, the theorem has a measure-theoretic refinement: the normalized zero-counting measures of $f^{(n)}$ converge to an explicitly described probability measure supported on the edges of the Voronoi diagram of the poles.
