= Generalization =

Form of abstraction

A generalization is a form of abstraction whereby common properties of specific instances are formulated as general concepts or claims. Generalizations posit the existence of a domain or set of elements, as well as one or more common characteristics shared by those elements (thus creating a conceptual model). As such, they are the essential basis of all valid deductive inferences (particularly in logic, mathematics and science), where the process of verification is necessary to determine whether a generalization holds true for any given situation.

Generalization can also be used to refer to the process of identifying the parts of a whole, as belonging to the whole. The parts, which might be unrelated when left on their own, may be brought together as a group, hence belonging to the whole by establishing a common relation between them.

However, the parts cannot be generalized into a whole—until a common relation is established among all parts. This does not mean that the parts are unrelated, only that no common relation has been established yet for the generalization.

The concept of generalization has broad application in many connected disciplines, and might sometimes have a more specific meaning in a specialized context (e.g. generalization in psychology, generalization in learning).

In general, given two related concepts A and B, A is a "generalization" of B (equiv., B is a special case of A) if and only if both of the following hold:

- Every instance of concept B is also an instance of concept A.
- There are instances of concept A which are not instances of concept B.

For example, the concept animal is a generalization of the concept bird, since every bird is an animal, but not all animals are birds (dogs, for instance). For more, see Specialisation (biology).

== Hypernym and hyponym ==
The connection of generalization to specialization (or particularization) is reflected in the contrasting words hypernym and hyponym. A hypernym as a generic stands for a class or group of equally ranked items, such as the term tree which stands for equally ranked items such as peach and oak, and the term ship which stands for equally ranked items such as cruiser and steamer. In contrast, a hyponym is one of the items included in the generic, such as peach and oak which are included in tree, and cruiser and steamer which are included in ship. A hypernym is superordinate to a hyponym, and a hyponym is subordinate to a hypernym.

== Examples ==
=== Biological generalization ===
When the mind makes a generalization, it extracts the essence of a concept based on its analysis of similarities from many discrete objects. The resulting simplification enables higher-level thinking.

An animal is a generalization of a mammal, a bird, a fish, an amphibian and a reptile.

=== Cartographic generalization of geo-spatial data ===
Generalization has a long history in cartography as an art of creating maps for different scale and purpose. Cartographic generalization is the process of selecting and representing information of a map in a way that adapts to the scale of the display medium of the map. In this way, every map has, to some extent, been generalized to match the criteria of display. This includes small cartographic scale maps, which cannot convey every detail of the real world. As a result, cartographers must decide and then adjust the content within their maps, to create a suitable and useful map that conveys the geospatial information within their representation of the world.

Generalization is meant to be context-specific. That is to say, correctly generalized maps are those that emphasize the most important map elements, while still representing the world in the most faithful and recognizable way. The level of detail and importance in what is remaining on the map must outweigh the insignificance of items that were generalized—so as to preserve the distinguishing characteristics of what makes the map useful and important.

=== Mathematical generalizations ===
In mathematics, one commonly says that a concept or a result B is a generalization of A if A is defined or proved before B (historically or conceptually) and A is a special case of B.

- The complex numbers are a generalization of the real numbers, which are a generalization of the rational numbers, which are a generalization of the integers, which are a generalization of the natural numbers.
- A polygon is a generalization of a 3-sided triangle, a 4-sided quadrilateral, and so on to n sides.
- A hypercube is a generalization of a 2-dimensional square, a 3-dimensional cube, and so on to n dimensions.
- A quadric, such as a hypersphere, ellipsoid, paraboloid, or hyperboloid, is a generalization of a conic section to higher dimensions.
- A Taylor series is a generalization of a MacLaurin series.
- The binomial formula is a generalization of the formula for $(1+x)^n$.
- A ring is a generalization of a field.

== See also ==
- Anti-unification
- Categorical imperative (ethical generalization)
- Ceteris paribus
- Class diagram § Generalization/Inheritance
- External validity (scientific studies)
- Faulty generalization
- Generic (disambiguation)
- Critical thinking
- Generic antecedent
- Hasty generalization
- Inheritance (object-oriented programming)
- Mutatis mutandis
- -onym
- Ramer–Douglas–Peucker algorithm
- Semantic compression
- Inventor's paradox
