= Igor Irodov =

Russian Physicist

- Prof. Irodov c.1975
- Born: 16 November 1923; Murom, Vladimir Oblast, Russia
- Died: 22 October 2002 (aged 78); Moscow, Russia
- Education: Moscow Institute of Physics and Engineering
- Known for: Lecture course on general physics
- Scientific career
- Fields: Physics
- Thesis: Focusing and dispersive properties of particular magnetic fields (1956)
- Doctoral advisor: Lev Artsimovich

Igor Yevgenyevich Irodov (Russian: Игорь Евгеньевич Иродов; 16 November 1923 – 22 October 2002) was a Soviet Russian physicist and World War II veteran. He is best known as a physics professor at the Moscow Institute of Physics and Engineering (MEPHi) and as the author of a series of handbooks on general physics, which became lecture courses in physics in several countries.

== Biography ==
Irodov was born in Murom, Vladimir Oblast, Russia. When he was eight, his family moved to Moscow, where he lived until his death. During World War II, he fought with various infantry units at the 1st and 4th Ukrainian Fronts, also serving as a drafter and cartographer. He traveled through Russia, Ukraine and Poland, ending the war in Czechoslovakia. For his bravery, he was awarded the orders of the Patriotic War (II degree, 1945) and Red Star (1944), as well as the medals for Courage (1943), Battle Merit (1944) and the Victory over Germany (1946).

In October 1945, Irodov was demobilized and sent to Moscow to recover his health. In February 1946, he entered the Physics Faculty of MEPHi, graduating with honors in November 1950 with a diploma of designer and operator of physics equipment. After that, he worked on his PhD titled Focusing and dispersive properties of particular magnetic fields (Russian: Исследование фокусирующих и диспергирующих свойств некоторых вариантов магнитных полей), which he defended in May 1956 under Academician Lev Artsimovich. Starting in 1954, he worked at the General Physics Department of MEPHi, first as a lecturer and, since 1976, as a full professor.

== Publications ==
In 1957, Irodov published his first book, a collection of problems in atomic physics, which was republished in 1959 and later translated into Polish, Romanian and English. Its eighth and expanded edition, issued in 2002, became Irodov's last substantial work. He also published collections of problems in general physics in 1968 and 1979, which are still used by many students around the world to hone their physics skills and prepare for various Engineering Entrance Exams. This book is considered the pinnacle of physics preparation for various engineering entrance tests as its questions are above the contemporary questions asked. It is also used as a resource for starter level preparation for physics Olympiads.

Irodov spent 27 years of his life writing a series of handbooks that fully covered a university course on general physics. He published the first part (mechanics) in 1975, the second part (electromagnetism) in 1983, and the full set from 1999 to 2001. In his handbooks, Irodov aimed for brevity, crafting concise and clear definitions while removing unessential details and heavy calculus, and he focused on relating theory to practical examples and problems.

Books in English

- A collection of problems in atomic and nuclear physics (1966) Google Books, Archive.org
- Fundamental Laws of Mechanics (1980) Archive.org
- Problems in General Physics (1981), Archive.org
- Basic laws of Electromagnetism (1983) Archive.org
