= Sui Generis (disambiguation) =

Sui generis is a status that defies categorization

Sui Generis may also refer to:

- Sui Generis, an Argentine folk-rock band
- Sui Generis (album), a 1989 recording by Yuri
