= Generic =

Generic or generics may refer to:

== In business ==
- Generic term, a common name used for a range or class of similar things not protected by trademark
- Generic brand, a brand for a product that does not have an associated brand or trademark, other than the trading name of the business providing the product
- Generic trademark, a trademark that sometimes or usually replaces a common term in colloquial usage
- Generic drug, a drug identified by its chemical name rather than its brand name

== In computer programming ==
- Generic function, a computer programming entity made up of all methods having the same name
- Generic programming, a computer programming paradigm based on method/functions or classes defined irrespective of the concrete data types used upon instantiation
  - Generics in Java

== In linguistics ==
- A pronoun or other word used with a less specific meaning, such as:
  - generic you
  - generic he or generic she
  - generic they
- Generic mood, a grammatical mood used to make generalized statements like Snow is white
- Generic antecedents, referents in linguistic contexts, which are classes

== In mathematics ==
- Generic filter, in mathematical logic and set theory, a tool for studying axiom independence
- Generic point, a point of an algebraic variety, which has no other property than those that are shared by all other points, or, in scheme theory, a point that contains all other points
- Generic polynomial, a polynomial whose coefficients are indeterminates
- Generic property, a formal definition of a property shared by almost all objects of a specific type
- GENERIC formalism, a mathematical framework to describe irreversible phenomena in thermodynamics
- 1-generic, in computability, a kind of "random" sequence

== Other ==
- Generic role-playing game system, a framework that provides rule mechanics for any setting—world or environment or genre
- Genus, the generic name for classification of an organism in taxonomy
- Album – Generic Flipper, an album by the band Flipper
- Generic, the surname of the titular character and his family on Bobby’s World

== See also ==
- Generic name (disambiguation)
