= Mathematics and Plausible Reasoning =

- Author: George Pólya
- Genre: Mathematics
- Publication date: 1954

Mathematics and Plausible Reasoning is a two-volume book by the mathematician George Pólya describing various methods for being a good guesser of new mathematical results. In the Preface to Volume 1 of the book Pólya exhorts all interested students of mathematics thus: "Certainly, let us learn proving, but also let us learn guessing." P. R. Halmos reviewing the book summarised the central thesis of the book thus: ". . . a good guess is as important as a good proof."

== Outline ==
=== Volume I: Induction and analogy in mathematics ===
Polya begins Volume I with a discussion on induction, not mathematical induction, but as a way of guessing new results. He shows how the chance observations of a few results of the form 4 = 2 + 2, 6 = 3 + 3, 8 = 3 + 5, 10 = 3 + 7, etc., may prompt a sharp mind to formulate the conjecture that every even number greater than 4 can be represented as the sum of two odd prime numbers. This is the well known Goldbach's conjecture. The first problem in the first chapter is to guess the rule according to which the successive terms of the following sequence are chosen: 11, 31, 41, 61, 71, 101, 131, . . . In the next chapter the techniques of generalization, specialization and analogy are presented as possible strategies for plausible reasoning. In the remaining chapters, these ideas are illustrated by discussing the discovery of several results in various fields of mathematics like number theory, geometry, etc. and also in physical sciences.

=== Volume II: Patterns of Plausible Inference ===
This volume attempts to formulate certain patterns of plausible reasoning. The relation of these patterns with the calculus of probability are also investigated. Their relation to mathematical invention and instruction are also discussed. The following are some of the patterns of plausible inference discussed by Polya.

Sl. No.	Premise 1	Premise 2	Premise 3	plausible conclusion
1	A implies B	B is true	–	A is more credible.
2	A implies B_{n+1}	B_{n+1} is very different from the formerly verified consequences B_{1}, B_{2}, . . . , B_{n} of A	B_{n+1} true	A much more credible
3	A implies B_{n+1}	B_{n+1} is very similar to the formerly verified consequences B_{1}, B_{2}, . . . , B_{n} of A	B_{n+1} true	A just a little more credible
4	A implies B	B is very improbable in itself	B is true	A very much more credible
5	A implies B	B is quite probable in itself	B is true	A is just a little more credible
6	A analogous to B	B is true	–	A is more credible
7	A analogous to B	B is more credible	–	A is somewhat more credible
8	A is implied by B	B is false	–	A is less credible
9	A is incompatible with B	B is false	–	A is more credible

== Reviews ==
1. Bernhart, Arthur (1958-01-01). "Review of Mathematics and Plausible Reasoning". The American Mathematical Monthly. 65 (6): 456–457. doi:10.2307/2310741. hdl:2027/mdp.39015008206248. JSTOR 2310741. S2CID 121427033.
2. Rado, Tibor (1956-01-01). "Review of Mathematics and Plausible Reasoning". Philosophy of Science. 23 (2): 167. doi:10.1086/287478. JSTOR 185607.
3. Van Dantzig, D. (1959-01-01). "Review of Mathematics and Plausible Reasoning, G. Pólya". Synthese. 11 (4): 353–358. doi:10.1007/bf00486196. JSTOR 20114312. S2CID 46957889.
4. Broadbent, T. A. A. (1956-01-01). "Review of Mathematics and Plausible Reasoning". The Mathematical Gazette. 40 (333): 233–234. doi:10.2307/3608848. hdl:2027/mdp.39015008206248. JSTOR 3608848.
5. Bush, Robert R. (1956-01-01). "Review of Mathematics and Plausible Reasoning". The American Journal of Psychology. 69 (1): 166–167. doi:10.2307/1418146. hdl:2027/mdp.39015008206248. JSTOR 1418146.
6. Johansson, I. (1955-01-01). "Review of Mathematics and plausible reasoning, I and II". Nordisk Matematisk Tidskrift. 3 (1): 64–65. JSTOR 24524537.
7. Prager, W. (1955-01-01). "Review of Mathematics and plausible reasoning. Volume I: Induction and analogy. Volume II: Patterns of plausible inference". Quarterly of Applied Mathematics. 13 (3): 344–345. JSTOR 43634251.
8. Meserve, Bruce E. (1955-01-01). "Review of Induction and Analogy in Mathematics, Vol. I, and Patterns of Plausible Inference, Vol. II, of Mathematics and Plausible Reasoning". The Mathematics Teacher. 48 (4): 272. JSTOR 27954884.
9. Savage, Leonard J. (1955-01-01). "Review of Mathematics and Plausible Reasoning. Volume I, Induction and Analogy in Mathematics. Volume II, Patterns of Plausible Inference". Journal of the American Statistical Association. 50 (272): 1352–1354. doi:10.2307/2281238. JSTOR 2281238.
10. פ., א. י. י. (1957-01-01). "Review of Mathematics and Plausible Reasoning. Volume I: Induction and Analogy in Mathematics; Volume II: Patterns of Plausible Reasoning". Iyyun: The Jerusalem Philosophical Quarterly / עיון: רבעון פילוסופי. ח' (א'): 48–49. JSTOR 23301574.
11. Stein, Robert G. (1991-01-01). "Review of Patterns of Plausible Inference. Vol. 2 of Mathematics and Plausible Reasoning (R), George Pólya". The Mathematics Teacher. 84 (7): 574. JSTOR 27967294.
12. Alexanderson, G. L. (1979-01-01). "Review of Mathematics and Plausible Reasoning: Vol. I: Induction and Analogy in Mathematics; Mathematics and Plausible Reasoning: Vol. II: Patterns of Plausible Inference, George Polya". The Two-Year College Mathematics Journal. 10 (2): 119–122. doi:10.2307/3027025. JSTOR 3027025.
