= Laguerre–Pólya class =

The Laguerre–Pólya class is the class of entire functions consisting of those functions which are locally the limit of a series of polynomials whose roots are all real. Any function of Laguerre–Pólya class is also of Pólya class.

The product of two functions in the class is also in the class, so the class constitutes a monoid under the operation of function multiplication.

Some properties of a function $E(z)$ in the Laguerre–Pólya class are:

- All roots are real.
- $|E(x+iy)|=|E(x-iy)|$ for x and y real.
- $|E(x+iy)|$ is a non-decreasing function of y for positive y.

A function is of Laguerre–Pólya class if and only if three conditions are met:

- The roots are all real.
- The nonzero zeros z_{n} satisfy

$\sum_n\frac{1}{|z_n|^2}$ converges, with zeros counted according to their multiplicity)

- The function can be expressed in the form of a Hadamard product

$$z^m e^{a+bz+cz^2}\prod_n \left(1-z/z_n\right)\exp(z/z_n)$$

with b and c real and c non-positive. (The non-negative integer m will be positive if E(0)=0. Note that if the number of zeros is infinite one may have to define how to take the infinite product.)

== Examples ==
Some examples are $\sin(z), \cos(z), \exp(z), \exp(-z), \text{and }\exp(-z^2).$

On the other hand, $\sinh(z), \cosh(z), \text{and } \exp(z^2)$ are not in the Laguerre–Pólya class.

For example,

$$\exp(-z^2)=\lim_{n \to \infty}(1-z^2/n)^n.$$

Cosine can be done in more than one way. Here is one series of polynomials having all real roots:

$$\cos z=\lim_{n \to \infty}((1+iz/n)^n+(1-iz/n)^n)/2$$

And here is another:

$$\cos z=\lim_{n \to \infty}\prod_{m=1}^n \left(1-\frac{z^2}{((m-\frac{1}{2})\pi)^2}\right)$$

This shows the buildup of the Hadamard product for cosine.

If we replace z^{2} with z, we have another function in the class:

$$\cos \sqrt z=\lim_{n \to \infty}\prod_{m=1}^n \left(1-\frac z{((m-\frac{1}{2})\pi)^2}\right)$$

Another example is the reciprocal gamma function 1/Γ(z). It is the limit of polynomials as follows:

$$1/\Gamma(z)=\lim_{n \to \infty}\frac 1{n!}(1-(\ln n)z/n)^n\prod_{m=0}^n(z+m).$$
