= Arthur Hirsch =

German mathematician

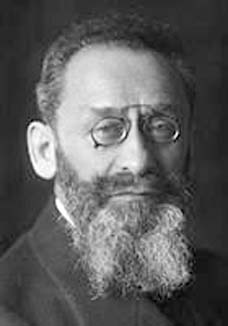
- Born: 19 July 1866; Königsberg, Prussia (now Kaliningrad, Russia)
- Died: 18 November 1948 (aged 82); Zürich, Switzerland
- Education: University of Königsberg
- Scientific career
- Fields: Mathematics
- Workplaces: ETH Zurich
- Thesis: Zur Theorie der linearen Differentialgleichung mit rationalem Integral (1892)

Arthur Hirsch (1866–1948) was a German mathematician.

== Life and work ==
Hirsch completed his schooling in Königsberg in 1882 and then studied mathematics and physics in the universities of Berlin and Königsberg. Among his teachers at Königsberg were David Hilbert and Adolf Hurwitz. In 1892 he received a doctorate from Königsberg for a thesis about linear differential equations.

The following year, he took his docent habilitation at Polytechnikum of Zurich, where he was, successively, assistant professor from 1893, titular professor from 1897 and ordinary professor from 1903 until his retirement in 1936.

The work of Hirsch is primarily on differential equations and hypergeometric functions. He published seven papers about it in Mathematische Annalen. Hirsch was a member of the Swiss Mathematical Society from his foundation in 1910.

== Sources ==
- Eminger, Stefanie (2012). "Viribus unitis! shall be our watchword: the first International Congress of Mathematicians, held 9–11 August 1897 in Zurich". BSHM Bulletin. 27 (3): 155–168. doi:10.1080/17498430.2012.687496. ISSN 1749-8430. S2CID 121968603.
- Eminger, Stefanie Ursula (2015). Carl Friedrich Geiser and Ferdinand Rudio: The Men Behind the First International Congress of Mathematicians (PDF). St Andrews University.
- Frei, Günther; Stammbach, Urs (1992). Hermann Weyl und die Mathematik an der ETH Zürich, 1913–1930 (in German). Birkhäuser. ISBN 978-3-0348-9700-6.
- Frei, Günther; Stammbach, Urs (1994). Die Mathematiker an den Zürcher Hochschulen (in German). Birkhäuser. ISBN 978-3-7643-5078-9.
