= George Pólya =

Hungarian-American mathematician and educator (1887–1985)

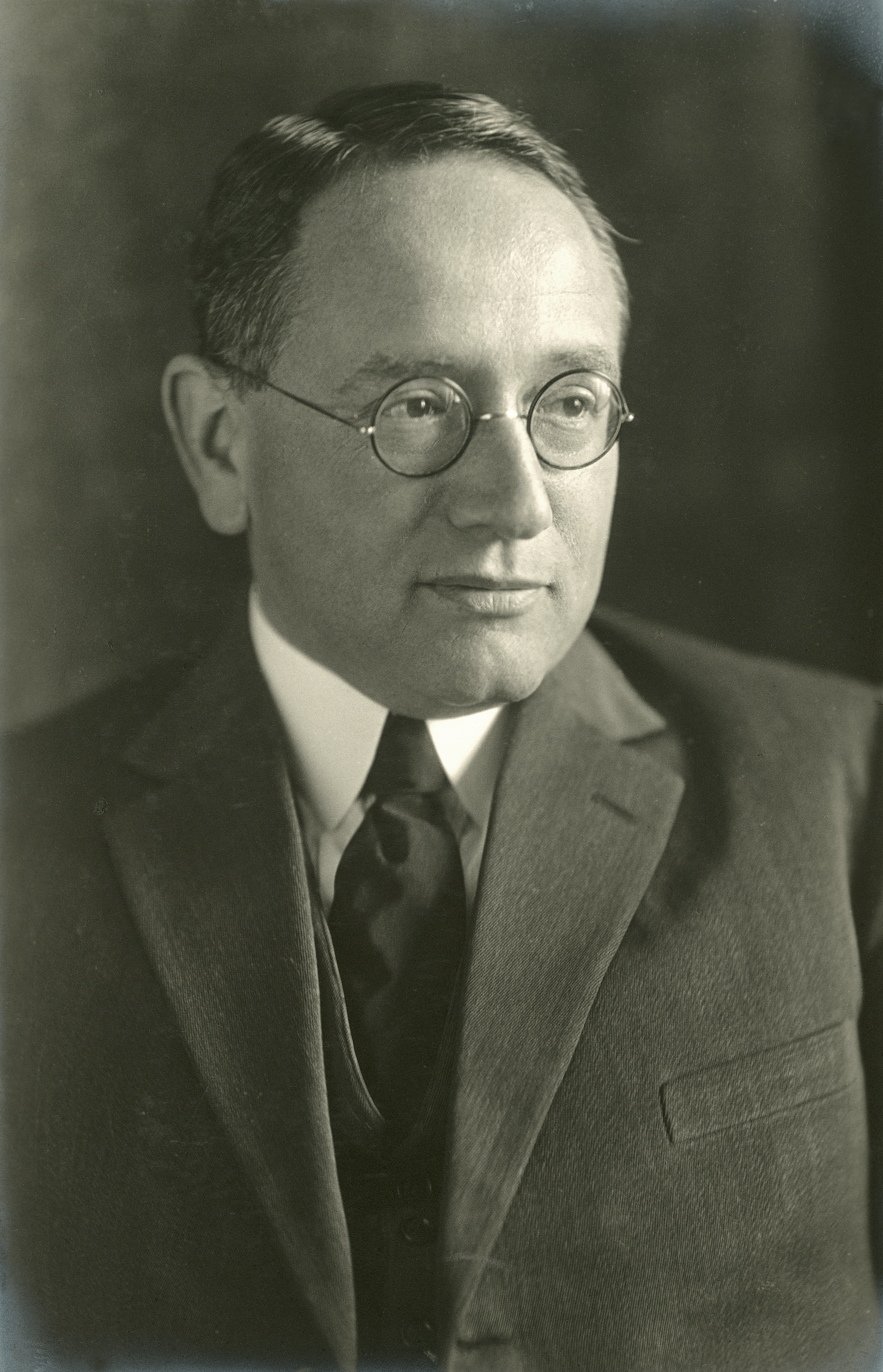
- Pólya, before 1935
- Born: Pólya György; December 13, 1887; Budapest, Austria-Hungary
- Died: September 7, 1985 (aged 97); Palo Alto, California, U.S.
- Citizenship: Hungarian; Swiss (1918–1947); American (1947–)
- Education: Eötvös Loránd University
- Known for: How to Solve It; Pólya enumeration theorem Pólya urn model Hilbert–Pólya conjecture Laguerre–Pólya class Also, see List of things named after George Pólya
- Scientific career
- Fields: Mathematics
- Workplaces: ETH Zürich; Stanford University
- Doctoral advisor: Lipót Fejér
- Doctoral students: Albert Edrei; Hans Einstein; Fritz Gassmann; Albert Pfluger; Walter Saxer; James J. Stoker; Alice Roth

George Pólya (/ˈpoʊljə/; Hungarian: Pólya György [ˈpoːjɒ ˈɟørɟ]; December 13, 1887 – September 7, 1985) was a Hungarian-American mathematician. He was a professor of mathematics from 1914 to 1940 at ETH Zürich and from 1940 to 1953 at Stanford University. He made fundamental contributions to combinatorics, number theory, complex analysis, numerical analysis and probability theory. He is also noted for his work in heuristics and mathematics education. He has been described as one of The Martians, an informal category of Hungarian-American scientists that also included one of his most famous students, John von Neumann.

== Life and works ==
Pólya was born in Budapest, Austria-Hungary, to Anna Deutsch and Jakab Pólya, Hungarian Jews who had converted to Christianity in 1886. Although his parents were religious and he was baptized into the Catholic Church upon birth, George eventually grew up to be an agnostic. He received a PhD under Lipót Fejér in 1912, at Eötvös Loránd University. He was a professor of mathematics from 1914 to 1940 at ETH Zürich in Switzerland and from 1940 to 1953 at Stanford University. He remained a professor emeritus at Stanford for the rest of his career, working on a range of mathematical topics, including series, number theory, mathematical analysis, geometry, algebra, combinatorics, and probability. He was invited to speak at the International Congress of Mathematicians at Bologna in 1928, at Oslo in 1936 and at Cambridge, Massachusetts, in 1950. He continued lecturing part-time and publishing books into his nineties, decades after his official retirement in 1953.

On September 7, 1985, Pólya died at age 97 in Palo Alto, California, due to complications of a stroke he suffered during that summer. He was survived by his wife Stella, after 67 years of marriage.

== Heuristics ==
Early in his career, Pólya wrote with Gábor Szegő two influential problem books, Problems and Theorems in Analysis (I: Series, Integral Calculus, Theory of Functions and II: Theory of Functions, Zeros, Polynomials, Determinants, Number Theory, Geometry). Later in his career, he spent considerable effort to identify systematic methods of problem solving to foster discovery and invention for students, teachers, and researchers. He wrote five books on the subject: How to Solve It, Mathematics and Plausible Reasoning (Volume I: Induction and Analogy in Mathematics, and Volume II: Patterns of Plausible Inference), and Mathematical Discovery: On Understanding, Learning, and Teaching Problem Solving (volumes 1 and 2).

In How to Solve It, Pólya provides general heuristics for solving a gamut of mathematical and non-mathematical problems. The book includes advice for teachers and a mini-encyclopedia of heuristic terms. It was translated into several languages and has sold over a million copies. The book is still used in mathematical education. Douglas Lenat's Automated Mathematician and Eurisko artificial intelligence programs were inspired by Pólya's work.

In addition to his works directly addressing problem solving, Pólya authored another short book called Mathematical Methods in Science edited by Leon Bowden, initially a 1963 work supported by the National Science Foundation, later revised in 1977. As Pólya notes in the preface, Bowden carefully followed a tape recording of a course that Pólya taught several times at Stanford, in order to put the book together. Pólya notes in the preface that "the following pages will be useful, yet they should not be regarded as a finished expression."

== Legacy ==
There are three prizes named after Pólya, causing occasional confusion of one for another. In 1969 the Society for Industrial and Applied Mathematics (SIAM) established the George Pólya Prize, given alternately in two categories for "a notable application of combinatorial theory" and for "a notable contribution in another area of interest to George Pólya." In 1976 the Mathematical Association of America (MAA) established the George Pólya Award "for articles of expository excellence" published in the College Mathematics Journal. In 1987 the London Mathematical Society (LMS) established the Pólya Prize for "outstanding creativity in, imaginative exposition of, or distinguished contribution to, mathematics within the United Kingdom."

In 1991, the MAA established the George Pólya Lectureship series. Stanford University has a Polya Hall named in his honor.

== Selected publications ==
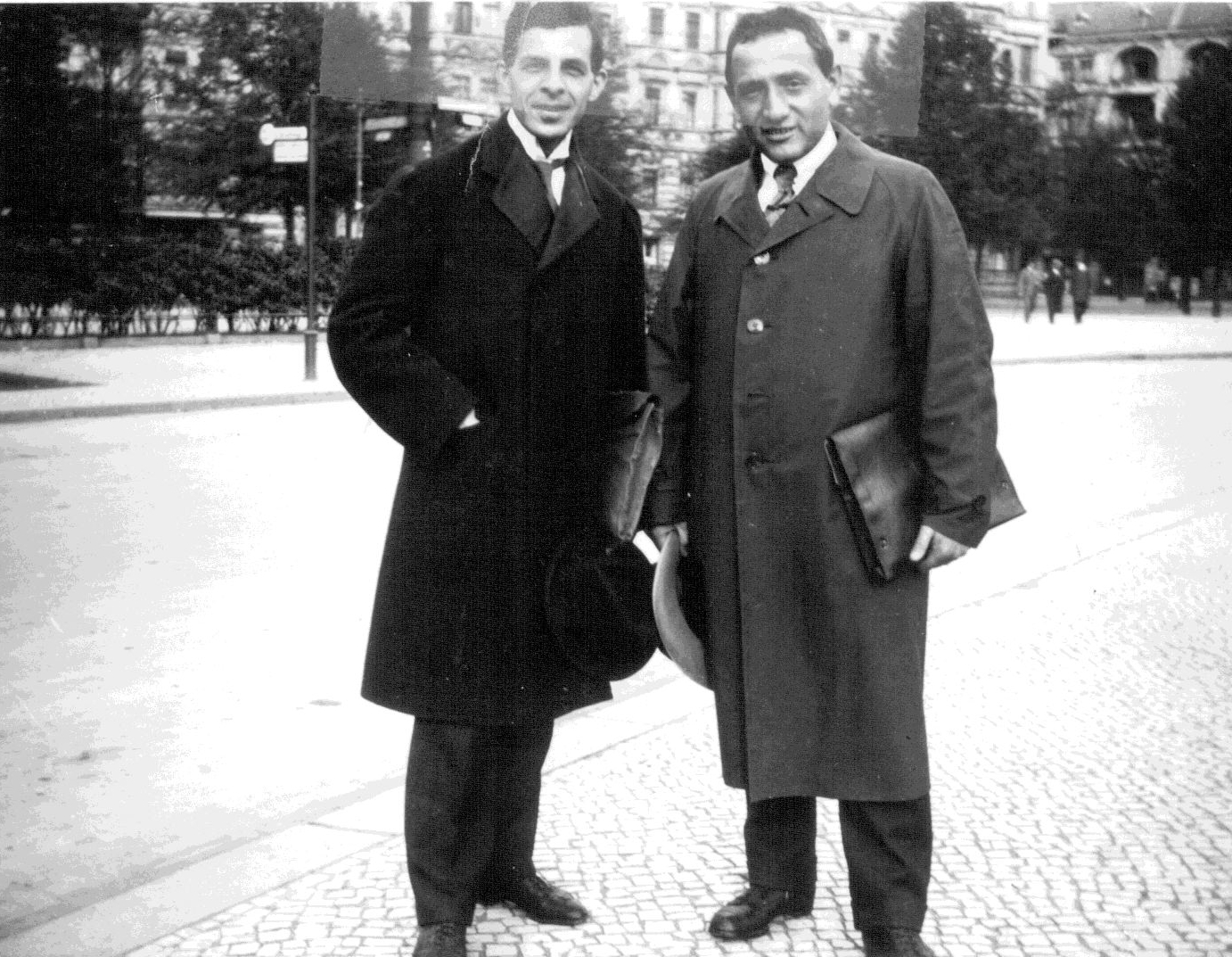
Pólya and Gábor Szegő in Berlin, delivering the manuscript of Aufgaben und Lehrsätze aus der Analysis to Springer

=== Books ===
- with Gábor Szegő: Aufgaben und Lehrsätze aus der Analysis, 1st edn. 1925. ("Problems and theorems in analysis"). Springer, Berlin:
  - Vol. 1: Reihen. 4th edn., 1975. ISBN 3-540-04874-X.
  - Vol. 2: Funktionentheorie, Nullstellen, Polynome, Determinanten, Zahlentheorie. 4th edn., 1975. ISBN 3-540-05456-1.
- Mathematik und plausibles Schliessen. Birkhäuser, Basel:
  - Vol. 1: Induktion und Analogie in der Mathematik, 3rd edn., 1988. ISBN 3-7643-1986-0 (Wissenschaft und Kultur; 14).
  - Vol. 2: Typen und Strukturen plausibler Folgerung, 2nd edn., 1975. ISBN 3-7643-0715-3 (Wissenschaft und Kultur; 15).
  - English translation: Mathematics and Plausible Reasoning, Princeton University Press 1954, 2 volumes (Vol. 1: Induction and Analogy in Mathematics, Vol. 2: Patterns of Plausible Inference)
- Schule des Denkens. Vom Lösen mathematischer Probleme ("How to solve it"). 4th edn. Francke Verlag, Tübingen 1995, ISBN 3-7720-0608-6 (Sammlung Dalp).
  - English translation: How to Solve It. Expanded 2nd edn. Princeton University Press 2004 (with foreword by John Horton Conway and added exercises)
- Vom Lösen mathematischer Aufgaben. 2nd edn. Birkhäuser, Basel 1983, ISBN 3-7643-0298-4 (Wissenschaft und Kultur; 21).
  - English translation: Mathematical Discovery: On Understanding, Learning and Teaching Problem Solving, 2 volumes, Wiley 1962 (re-published 1981 in one vol.)
- Collected Papers, 4 volumes, MIT Press 1974 (ed. Ralph P. Boas). Vol. 1: Singularities of Analytic Functions, Vol. 2: Location of Zeros, Vol. 3: Analysis, Vol. 4: Probability, Combinatorics
- with R. C. Read: Combinatorial enumeration of groups, graphs, and chemical compounds, Springer Verlag 1987 (English translation of Kombinatorische Anzahlbestimmungen für Gruppen, Graphen und chemische Verbindungen, Acta Mathematica, vol. 68, 1937, pp. 145–254) ISBN 978-0387964133
- with Godfrey Harold Hardy, John Edensor Littlewood: Inequalities, Cambridge University Press 1934
- Mathematical Methods in Science, 2nd edn. MAA 1977 (ed. Leon Bowden) ISBN 0-88385-626-3
- with Gordon Latta: Complex Variables, Wiley 1974
- with Robert E. Tarjan, Donald R. Woods: Notes on introductory combinatorics, Birkhäuser 1983 ISBN 978-3-7643-3170-2
- with Jeremy Kilpatrick: The Stanford mathematics problem book: with hints and solutions, New York: Teachers College Press 1974
- with several co-authors: Applied combinatorial mathematics, Wiley 1964 (ed. Edwin F. Beckenbach)
- with Gábor Szegő: Isoperimetric inequalities in mathematical physics, Princeton, Annals of Mathematics Studies 27, 1951

=== Articles ===
- Pólya, G. (1922). "On the mean-value theorem corresponding to a given linear homogeneous differential equation". Trans. Amer. Math. Soc. 24 (4): 312–324. doi:10.1090/s0002-9947-1922-1501228-5. MR 1501228.
- Pólya, G. (1929). "Untersuchungen über Lücken und Singularitäten von Potenzreihen". Mathematische Zeitschrift. 29 (1): 549–640. doi:10.1007/BF01180553. ISSN 1432-1823.
- Pólya, G. (1933). "Untersuchungen über Lücken und Singularitäten von Potenzreihen. Zweite Mitteilung". Ann. Math. 34 (4): 731–777. doi:10.2307/1968698. JSTOR 1968698.
- Polya, G. (1941). "On Functions Whose Derivatives Do Not Vanish in a Given Interval". Proc Natl Acad Sci U S A. 27 (4): 216–218. Bibcode:1941PNAS...27..216P. doi:10.1073/pnas.27.4.216. PMC 1078308. PMID 16578010.
- Polya, G. (1941). "Sur l'existence de fonctions entières satisfaisant à certaines conditions linéaires". Trans. Amer. Math. Soc. 50 (1): 129–139. doi:10.2307/1989913. JSTOR 1989913. MR 0004304.
- Boas, R. P.; Pólya, G. (1941). "Generalizations of Completely Convex Functions". Proc Natl Acad Sci U S A. 27 (6): 323–325. Bibcode:1941PNAS...27..323B. doi:10.1073/pnas.27.6.323. PMC 1078330. PMID 16588467.
- Pólya, G. (1942). "On converse gap theorems". Trans. Amer. Math. Soc. 52 (1): 65–71. doi:10.1090/s0002-9947-1942-0006577-0. MR 0006577.
- Pólya, G.; Wiener, N. (1942). "On the oscillation of the derivatives of a periodic function". Trans. Amer. Math. Soc. 52 (2): 249–256. doi:10.1090/s0002-9947-1942-0007169-x. MR 0007169.
- Pólya, G. (1943). "On the zeros of a derivative of a function and its analytic character" (PDF). Bull. Amer. Math. Soc. 49 (3, Part 1): 178–191. doi:10.1090/s0002-9904-1943-07853-6. MR 0007781.
- Pólya, G. (1947). "A Minimum Problem About the Motion of a Solid Through a Fluid". Proc Natl Acad Sci U S A. 33 (7): 218–221. Bibcode:1947PNAS...33..218P. doi:10.1073/pnas.33.7.218. PMC 1079030. PMID 16588747.
- Pólya, G. (1950). "Remark on Weyl's Note 'Inequalities Between the Two Kinds of Eigenvalues of a Linear Transformation'". Proc Natl Acad Sci U S A. 36 (1): 49–51. Bibcode:1950PNAS...36...49P. doi:10.1073/pnas.36.1.49. PMC 1063130. PMID 16588947.

== See also ==
- List of things named after George Pólya
- Pólya's proof that there is no "horse of a different color"
- Integer-valued polynomial
- Wallpaper group
