= Ziggurat algorithm =

Algorithm for pseudo-random number sampling

The ziggurat algorithm is an algorithm for pseudo-random number sampling. Belonging to the class of rejection sampling algorithms, it relies on an underlying source of uniformly-distributed random numbers, typically from a pseudo-random number generator, as well as precomputed tables. The algorithm is used to generate values from a monotonically decreasing probability distribution. It can also be applied to symmetric unimodal distributions, such as the normal distribution, by choosing a value from one half of the distribution and then randomly choosing which half the value is considered to have been drawn from. It was developed by George Marsaglia and others in the 1960s.

A typical value produced by the algorithm only requires the generation of one random floating-point value and one random table index, followed by one table lookup, one multiply operation and one comparison. Sometimes (2.5% of the time, in the case of a normal or exponential distribution when using typical table sizes) more computations are required. Nevertheless, the algorithm is computationally much faster than the two most commonly used methods of generating normally distributed random numbers, the Marsaglia polar method and the Box–Muller transform, which require at least one logarithm and one square root calculation for each pair of generated values. However, since the ziggurat algorithm is more complex to implement it is best used when large quantities of random numbers are required.

The term ziggurat algorithm dates from Marsaglia's paper with Wai Wan Tsang in 2000; it is so named because it is conceptually based on covering the probability distribution with rectangular segments stacked in decreasing order of size, resulting in a figure that resembles a ziggurat.

The Ziggurat algorithm used to generate sample values with a normal distribution. (Only positive values are shown for simplicity.) The pink dots are initially uniform-distributed random numbers. The desired distribution function is first segmented into equal areas "A". One layer i is selected at random by the uniform source at the left. Then a random value from the top source is multiplied by the width of the chosen layer, and the result is x tested to see which region of the layer it falls into with 3 possible outcomes: 1) (left, solid black region) the sample is clearly under the curve and may be output immediately, 2) (right, vertically striped region) the sample value may lie under the curve, and must be tested further. In that case, a random y value within the chosen layer is generated and compared to f(x). If less, the point is under the curve and the value x is output. If not, (the third case), the chosen point x is rejected and the algorithm is restarted from the beginning.

== Theory of operation ==
The ziggurat algorithm is a rejection sampling algorithm; it randomly generates a point in a distribution slightly larger than the desired distribution, then tests whether the generated point is inside the desired distribution. If not, it tries again. Given a random point underneath a probability density curve, its x coordinate is a random number with the desired distribution.

The distribution the ziggurat algorithm chooses from is made up of n equal-area regions; $n - 1$ rectangles that cover the bulk of the desired distribution, on top of a non-rectangular base that includes the tail of the distribution.

Given a monotone decreasing probability density function $f(x)$, defined for all $x \geq 0$ , the base of the ziggurat is defined as all points inside the distribution and below $y_1 = f(x_1)$. This consists of a rectangular region from $(0, 0)$ to $(x_1, y_1)$, and the (typically infinite) tail of the distribution, where $x \ge x_1 (\text{and } y\le y_1)$.

This layer (call it layer 0) has area A. On top of this, add a rectangular layer of width $x_1$ and height $A/x_1$, so it also has area $A$. The top of this layer is at height $y_2 = y_1 + A/x_1$ and intersects the density function at a point $(x_2, y_2)$, where $y_2 = f(x_2)$. This layer includes every point in the density function between $y_1$ and $y_2$, but (unlike the base layer) also includes points such as $(x_1, y_2)$ which are not in the desired distribution.

Further layers are then stacked on top. To use a precomputed table of size $n$ (n = 256 is typical), one chooses $x_1$such that $x_n = 0$, meaning that the top box, layer $n - 1$, reaches the distribution's peak at $(0, f(0))$ exactly.

Layer $i$ extends vertically in range $[y_i, y_{i+1}]$, and can be divided into two regions horizontally: the (generally larger) portion in range $[0, x_{i+1}]$ which is entirely contained within the desired distribution, and the (small) portion in range $[x_{i+1}, x]$, which is only partially contained.

Ignoring for a moment the problem of layer 0, and given uniform random variables $U_0$ and $U_1 \in [0, 1)$, the ziggurat algorithm can be described as:

1. Choose a random layer $0 \leq i < n$.
2. Let $x = U_0x_i$.
3. If $x<x_{i+1}$, return $x$.
4. Let $y = y_i+U_1(y_{i+1}-y_i)$.
5. Compute $f(x)$. If $y < f(x)$, return $x$.
6. Otherwise, choose new random numbers and go back to step 1.

Step 1 amounts to choosing a low-resolution y coordinate. Step 3 tests if the x coordinate is clearly within the desired density function without knowing more about the y coordinate. If it is not, step 4 chooses a high-resolution y coordinate, and step 5 does the rejection test.

With closely spaced layers, the algorithm terminates at step 3 a very large fraction of the time. For the top layer $n-1$, however, this test always fails, because $x_n = 0$.

Layer 0 can also be divided into a central region and an edge, but the edge is an infinite tail. To use the same algorithm to check if the point is in the central region, generate a fictitious $x_0 = A/y_1$. This will generate points with $x<x_1$ with the correct frequency, and in the rare case that layer 0 is selected and $x\geq x_1$, use a special fallback algorithm to select a point at random from the tail. Because the fallback algorithm is used less than one time in a thousand, speed is not essential.

Thus, the full ziggurat algorithm for one-sided distributions is:

1. Choose a random layer $0 \leq i < n$.
2. Let $x = U_0x_i$.
3. If $x<x_{i+1}$, return $x$.
4. If $i = 0$, generate a point from the tail using the fallback algorithm.
5. Let $y = y_i+U_1(y_{i+1}-y_i)$.
6. Compute $f(x)$. If $y < f(x)$, return $x$.
7. Otherwise, choose new random numbers and go back to step 1.

For a two-sided distribution, the result must be negated 50% of the time. This can often be done conveniently by choosing $U_0 \in [-1,1]$ and, in step 3, testing if $\mid x \mid < x_{i+1}$.

=== Fallback algorithms for the tail ===
Because the ziggurat algorithm only generates most outputs very rapidly, and requires a fallback algorithm whenever $x > x_{1}$ it is always more complex than a more direct implementation. The specific fallback algorithm depends on the distribution.

For an exponential distribution, the tail looks just like the body of the distribution. One way is to fall back to the most elementary algorithm E = −ln(U_{1}) and let x = x_{1} − ln(U_{1}). Another is to call the ziggurat algorithm recursively and add x_{1} to the result.

For a normal distribution, Marsaglia suggests a compact algorithm:

1. Let x = −ln(U_{1})/x_{1}.
2. Let y = −ln(U_{2}).
3. If 2y > x^{2}, return x + x_{1}.
4. Otherwise, go back to step 1.

Since x_{1} ≈ 3.5 for typical table sizes, the test in step 3 is almost always successful. Since −ln(U_{1}) is an exponentially distributed variate, an implementation of the exponential distribution may be used.

=== Optimizations ===
The algorithm can be performed efficiently with precomputed tables of x_{i} and y_{i} = f(x_{i}), but there are some modifications to make it even faster:

- Nothing in the ziggurat algorithm depends on the probability distribution function being normalized (integral under the curve equal to 1), removing normalizing constants can speed up the computation of f(x).
- Most uniform random number generators are based on integer random number generators which return an integer in the range [0, 2^{32} − 1]. A table of 2^{−32}x_{i} lets us use such numbers directly for U_{0}.
- When computing two-sided distributions using a two-sided U_{0} as described earlier, the random integer can be interpreted as a signed number in the range [−2^{31}, 2^{31} − 1], and a scale factor of 2^{−31} can be used.
- Rather than comparing U_{0}x_{i} to x_{i+1} in step 3, it is possible to precompute x_{i+1}/x_{i} and compare U_{0} with that directly. If U_{0} is an integer random number generator, these limits may be premultiplied by 2^{32} (or 2^{31}, as appropriate) so an integer comparison can be used.
- With the above two changes, the table of unmodified x_{i} values is no longer needed and may be deleted.
- When generating IEEE 754 single-precision floating point values, which only have a 24-bit mantissa (including the implicit leading 1), the least-significant bits of a 32-bit integer random number are not used. These bits may be used to select the layer number. (See the references below for a detailed discussion of this.)
- The first three steps may be put into an inline function, which can call an out-of-line implementation of the less frequently needed steps.

=== Generating the tables ===
It is possible to store the entire table precomputed, or just include the values n, y_{1}, A, and an implementation of f ^{−1}(y) in the source code, and compute the remaining values when initializing the random number generator.

As previously described, we can find x_{i} = f ^{−1}(y_{i}) and y_{i+1} = y_{i} + A/x_{i}. Repeat n − 1 times for the layers of the ziggurat. At the end, we should have y_{n} = f(0). There will be some round-off error, but it is a useful sanity test to see that it is acceptably small.

When actually filling in the table values, just assume that x_{n} = 0 and y_{n} = f(0), and accept the slight difference in layer n − 1's area as rounding error.

=== Finding x_{1} and A ===
Given an initial (guess at) x_{1}, we need a way to compute the area t of the tail for which x > x_{1}. For the exponential distribution, this is just e^{−x_{1}}, while for the normal distribution, assuming we are using the unnormalized f(x) = e^{−x^{2}/2}, this is $\sqrt{\frac{\pi}{2}} \text{erfc}(\frac{x}{\sqrt{2}})$ √π/2erfc(x/√2). For more awkward distributions, numerical integration may be required.

With this in hand, from x_{1}, we can find y_{1} = f(x_{1}), the area t in the tail, and the area of the base layer A = x_{1}y_{1} + t.

Then compute the series y_{i} and x_{i} as above. If y_{i} > f(0) for any i < n, then the initial estimate x_{1} was too low, leading to too large an area A. If y_{n} < f(0), then the initial estimate x_{1} was too high.

Given this, use a root-finding algorithm (such as the bisection method) to find the value x_{1} which produces y_{n−1} as close to f(0) as possible. Alternatively, look for the value which makes the area of the topmost layer, x_{n−1}(f(0) − y_{n−1}), as close to the desired value A as possible. This saves one evaluation of f ^{−1}(x) and is actually the condition of greatest interest.

== McFarland's variation ==
Christopher D. McFarland has proposed a further-optimized version. This applies three algorithmic changes, at the expense of slightly larger tables.

First, the common case considers only the rectangular portions, from (0, y_{i−1}) to (x_{i}, y_{i}) The odd-shaped regions to the right of these (mostly almost triangular, plus the tail) are handled separately. This simplifies and speeds up the algorithm's fast path.

Second, the exact area of the odd-shaped regions is used; they are not rounded up to include the entire rectangle to (x_{i−1}, y_{i}). This increases the probability that the fast path will be used.

One major consequence of this is that the number of layers is slightly less than n. Even though the area of the odd-shaped portions is taken exactly, the total adds up to more than one layer's worth. The area per layer is adjusted so that the number of rectangular layers is an integer. If the initial 0 ≤ i < n exceeds the number of rectangular layers, phase 2 proceeds.

If the value sought lies in any of the odd-shaped regions, the alias method is used to choose one, based on its true area. This is a small amount of additional work, and requires additional alias tables, but chooses one of the layers' right-hand sides.

The chosen odd-shaped region is rejection sampled, but if a sample is rejected, the algorithm does not return to the beginning. The true area of each odd-shaped region was used to choose a layer, so the rejection-sampling loop stays in that layer until a point is chosen.

Third, the almost-triangular shape of most odd-shaped portions is exploited, although this must be divided into three cases depending on the second derivative of the probability distribution function in the selected layer.

If the function is convex (as the exponential distribution is everywhere, and the normal distribution is for |x| > 1), then the function is strictly contained within the lower triangle. Two unit uniform deviates U_{1} and U_{2} are chosen, and before they are scaled to the rectangle enclosing the odd-shaped region, their sum is tested. If U_{1} + U_{2} > 1, the point is in the upper triangle and can be reflected to (1−U_{1}, 1−U_{2}). Then, if U_{1} + U_{2} < 1−ε, for some suitable tolerance ε, the point is definitely below the curve and can immediately be accepted. Only for points very close to the diagonal is it necessary to compute the distribution function f(x) to perform an exact rejection test. (The tolerance ε should in theory depend on the layer, but a single maximum value can be used on all layers with little loss.)

If the function is concave (as the normal distribution is for |x| < 1), it includes a small portion of the upper triangle so reflection is impossible, but points whose normalized coordinates satisfy U_{1} + U_{2} ≤ 1 can be immediately accepted, and points for which U_{1} + U_{2} > 1+ε can be immediately rejected.

In the one layer which straddles |x| = 1, the normal distribution has an inflection point, and the exact rejection test must be applied if 1−ε <U_{1} + U_{2} < 1+ε.

The tail is handled as in the original Ziggurat algorithm, and can be thought of as a fourth case for the shape of the odd-shaped region to the right.
