= Inverse method =

Inverse method may refer to:

- The inverse transform sampling method
- The inverse method in automated reasoning
