= Non-uniform random variate generation =

Generating pseudo-random numbers that follow a probability distribution

Non-uniform random variate generation or pseudo-random number sampling is the numerical practice of generating pseudo-random numbers (PRN) that follow a given probability distribution. Methods are typically based on the availability of a uniformly distributed PRN generator. Computational algorithms are then used to manipulate a single random variate, X, or often several such variates, into a new random variate Y such that these values have the required distribution. The first methods were developed for Monte-Carlo simulations in the Manhattan Project, published by John von Neumann in the early 1950s.

== Finite discrete distributions ==
For a discrete probability distribution with a finite number n of indices at which the probability mass function f takes non-zero values, the basic sampling algorithm is straightforward. The interval [0, 1) is divided in n intervals [0, f(1)), [f(1), f(1) + f(2)), ... The width of interval i equals the probability f(i). One draws a uniformly distributed pseudo-random number X, and searches for the index i of the corresponding interval. The so determined i will have the distribution f(i).

Formalizing this idea becomes easier by using the cumulative distribution function

$$F(i)=\sum_{j=1}^i f(j).$$

It is convenient to set F(0) = 0. The n intervals are then simply [F(0), F(1)), [F(1), F(2)), ..., [F(n − 1), F(n)). The main computational task is then to determine i for which F(i − 1) ≤ X < F(i).

This can be done by different algorithms:

- Linear search, computational time linear in n.
- Binary search, computational time goes with log n.
- Indexed search, also called the cutpoint method.
- Alias method, computational time is constant, using some pre-computed tables.
- There are other methods that cost constant time.

== Continuous distributions ==
Generic methods for generating independent samples:

- Rejection sampling for arbitrary density functions
- Inverse transform sampling for distributions whose CDF is known
- Ratio of uniforms, combining a change of variables and rejection sampling
- Slice sampling
- Ziggurat algorithm, for monotonically decreasing density functions as well as symmetric unimodal distributions
- Convolution random number generator, not a sampling method in itself: it describes the use of arithmetics on top of one or more existing sampling methods to generate more involved distributions.

Generic methods for generating correlated samples (often necessary for unusually-shaped or high-dimensional distributions):

- Markov chain Monte Carlo, the general principle
- Metropolis–Hastings algorithm
- Gibbs sampling
- Slice sampling
- Reversible-jump Markov chain Monte Carlo, when the number of dimensions is not fixed (e.g. when estimating a mixture model and simultaneously estimating the number of mixture components)
- Particle filters, when the observed data is connected in a Markov chain and should be processed sequentially

For generating a normal distribution:

- Box–Muller transform
- Marsaglia polar method

For generating a Poisson distribution:

- See Poisson distribution#Generating Poisson-distributed random variables

== Software libraries ==
Random distributions provided by software libraries
Distribution	NumPy	GNU Scientific Library
Beta	Yes	Yes
Binomial	Yes	Yes
Cauchy	Yes	Yes
Chi-squared	Yes	Yes
Dirichlet	Yes	Yes
Exponential	Yes	Yes
F	Yes	Yes
Gamma	Yes	Yes
Geometric	Yes	Yes
Gumbel	Yes	Yes
Hypergeometric	Yes	Yes
Laplace	Yes	Yes
Logistic	Yes	Yes
Log-normal	Yes	Yes
Logarithmic	Yes	Yes
Multinomial	Yes	Yes
Multivariate hypergeometric	Yes	No
Multivariate normal	Yes	Yes
Negative binomial	Yes	Yes
Noncentral chi-squared	Yes	No
Noncentral F	Yes	No
Normal	Yes	Yes
Pareto	Yes	Yes
Poisson	Yes	Yes
Power	Yes	?
Rayleigh	Yes	Yes
Students's t	Yes	Yes
Triangular	Yes	No
von Mises	Yes	No
Wald	Yes	No
Zeta	Yes	No

== See also ==
- Beta distribution#Random variate generation
- Dirichlet distribution#Random variate generation
- Exponential distribution#Random variate generation
- Gamma distribution#Random variate generation
- Geometric distribution#Random variate generation
- Gumbel distribution#Random variate generation
- Laplace distribution#Random variate generation
- Multinomial distribution#Random variate distribution
- Pareto distribution#Random variate generation
- Poisson distribution#Random variate generation

== Literature ==
- Devroye, L. (1986) Non-Uniform Random Variate Generation. New York: Springer
- Fishman, G.S. (1996) Monte Carlo. Concepts, Algorithms, and Applications. New York: Springer
- Hörmann, W.; J Leydold, G Derflinger (2004,2011) Automatic Nonuniform Random Variate Generation. Berlin: Springer.
- Knuth, D.E. (1997) The Art of Computer Programming, Vol. 2 Seminumerical Algorithms, Chapter 3.4.1 (3rd edition).
- Ripley, B.D. (1987) Stochastic Simulation. Wiley.
