= Mervin E. Muller =

American computer scientist

- Born: June 1, 1928; Los Angeles, California
- Died: December 3, 2018 (aged 90); Columbus, Ohio
- Education: University of California, Los Angeles (A.B., M.A., Ph.D.)
- Known for: Box-Muller transform
- Scientific career
- Thesis: Some Monte Carlo Methods for the Dirichlet Problem
- Doctoral advisor: George William Brown

Mervin Edgar Muller (1 June 1928 – 3 December 2018) was an American computer scientist and mathematician. The Box–Muller transform is named after him.

== Biography ==
Muller was born in Hollywood, Los Angeles, on 1 June 1928, as one of four sons to parents Emanuel and Bertha Muller. His parents were both immigrants from Hungary. He studied mathematics at the University of California, Los Angeles, earning a Ph.D. in 1954 under the supervision of George William Brown.

Muller worked for IBM in New York, and later, fifteen years with the World Bank in Washington, D. C.

He taught at UCLA, Cornell University, Princeton University, George Mason University, and the University of Wisconsin–Madison before joining the faculty of Ohio State University, where he retired as Robert Critchfield Professor of Engineering.

He has three sons with his wife, Barbara McAdam Muller. He died in Columbus, Ohio, on 3 December 2018, aged 90.

== Honors and awards ==
He was elected a fellow of the American Statistical Association in 1975. He was also the founding president of the International Association of Statistical Computing.
