= Rician fading =

Radio signal statistical model

Rician fading or Ricean fading is a stochastic model for radio propagation anomaly caused by partial cancellation of a radio signal by itself — the signal arrives at the receiver by several different paths (hence exhibiting multipath interference), and at least one of the paths is changing (lengthening or shortening). Rician fading occurs when one of the paths, typically a line of sight signal or some strong reflection signals, is much stronger than the others. In Rician fading, the amplitude gain is characterized by a Rician distribution.

Rayleigh fading is sometimes considered a special case of Rician fading for when there is no line of sight signal. In such a case, the Rician distribution, which describes the amplitude gain in Rician fading, reduces to a Rayleigh distribution. Rician fading itself is a special case of two-wave with diffuse power (TWDP) fading.

== Channel characterization ==
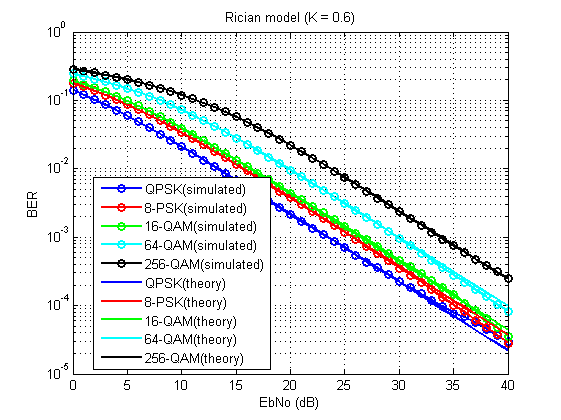
Bit error ratio performance of the PSK and QAM transmission over Rician flat fading channel ($K$ = 0.6, $\Omega$ = 1).

A Rician fading channel can be described by two parameters. The first one, $K$, is the ratio between the power in the direct path and the power in the other, scattered, paths:

$$K = \frac{\nu^2}{2\sigma^2}$$

The second one, $\Omega$, is the total power from both paths, and acts as a scaling factor to the distribution:

$$\Omega=\nu^2+2\sigma^2$$

The received signal amplitude (not the received signal power) $R$ is then Rice distributed with the following parameters:

$$\nu^2 = \frac{K}{1+K}\Omega$$
$$\sigma^2 = \frac{\Omega}{2(1+K)}$$

The resulting Probability density function is:

$$f(x) = \frac{2(K+1)x}{\Omega} \exp\left(-K-\frac{(K+1)x^2}{\Omega}\right) I_0\left(2\sqrt{\frac{K(K+1)}{\Omega}}x\right)
,$$

where $I_0(\cdot)$ is the 0th order modified Bessel function of the first kind.

== See also ==
- Fading
- Multipath propagation
- Diversity schemes
- Rayleigh fading
- Rice distribution
- Stochastics
- Statistics
- Stephen O. Rice
- Two-wave with diffuse power (TWDP) fading
