= Ossiander =

Ossiander is a surname. Notable people with the surname include:

- Andrés Lewin-Richter Ossiander (born 1937), Spanish composer of electronic music
- Gunnar Ossiander (1899–1984), Swedish actor
- Mina Ossiander, American mathematician
