= Two-wave with diffuse power fading =

Type of fading for radio and other electromagnetic waves.

In radio propagation, two-wave with diffuse power (TWDP) fading is a model that explains why a signal strengthens or weakens at certain locations or times. TWDP models fading due to the interference of two strong radio signals and numerous smaller, diffuse signals.

TWDP is a generalized system using a statistical model to produce results. Other statistical methods for predicting fading, including Rayleigh fading and Rician fading, can be considered as special cases of the TWDP model. The TWDP calculation produces a number of fading cases that the older models do not, especially in areas with crowded radio spectrum.

== Fading ==
Fading is an effect that occurs in many radio-related contexts. It occurs when a signal can take more than one path to a receiver, and the signals are effected differently along the two paths. The simplest case is when one path is longer than the other, but other delays and effects can cause similar results. In those cases, when the two (or more) signals are received at a single point, they may be out of phase, and thus potentially suffer from interference effects. If this occurs, the total signal received can be increased or decreased, but the effect is most noticeable when it makes the signal completely unreceivable, a deep fade.

The effect had been noticed from the start of radio experimentation, but was especially notable with the introduction of shortwave communications. It was identified as being due to self-interference due to multiple paths between the transmitter and receiver, which in turn led to the discovery and characterization of the ionosphere. This layer of the atmosphere is reflective, causing the signal to return to the Earth where it can reflect back into the sky, and in this way "skip" for long distances over the ground. This provided multiple paths to the receiver, with (for instance) a strong signal received after one reflection off the ionosphere and a weaker one after two reflections. The seemingly random fading effects were traced to the slow movement of billows in the ionosphere and the daily variation due to the effects of sunlight.

== Modelling fading ==
Attempts to model the effects of fading started almost immediately after the effect was first characterized. Earlier models included simplifications in order to make the math tractable.

Rayleigh fading is named for its use of the Rayleigh distribution of the signal. This is, in effect, the 2D distribution that results from the product of X and Y components that are separately and randomly distributed according to a normal distribution. By varying the parameters of the distributions, one can model different real-world cases. This model is useful when both of the signals are roughly equal in amplitude, as is the case when there is no direct line-of-sight between the transmitter and receiver. Rician fading is similar but uses the Rice distribution instead of Rayleigh, which is characterized by two parameters, shape and scale. This system is most useful when one of the paths is stronger, especially in line-of-sight applications.

A more general solution was long sought that did not require arbitrary limits on the distributions or envelopes. The first general solution was presented in 2002 by Durgin, Rappaport, and de Wolf. The new method used the KΔ parameter to characterize the distribution.

The new system predicts a number of deep fading scenarios that are not found in the older methods, notably Rayleigh. Jeff Frolik was the first to measure TWDP fading in an aircraft fuselage, coining the term hyper-Rayleigh to denote this and other fading scenarios that result in worse-than-Rayleigh received power outages for a radio link. Subsequently, other researchers have developed alternate, improved expressions for the TWDP distribution and its statistics. Recently, TWDP fading has been discovered for directional and vehicular millimeter wave channels.

The formulation of TWDP fading has upended classical RF design by providing a new "worst case design" scenario in fading in wireless links. Thus, common performance metrics in mobile communications such as bit error rate, outage probability, diversity gains, etc. can be significantly degraded by TWDP fading. Both measurements and theoretical predictions have shown that TWDP fading becomes more common as mobile radio links increase in both frequency and density.

== Channel characterization ==
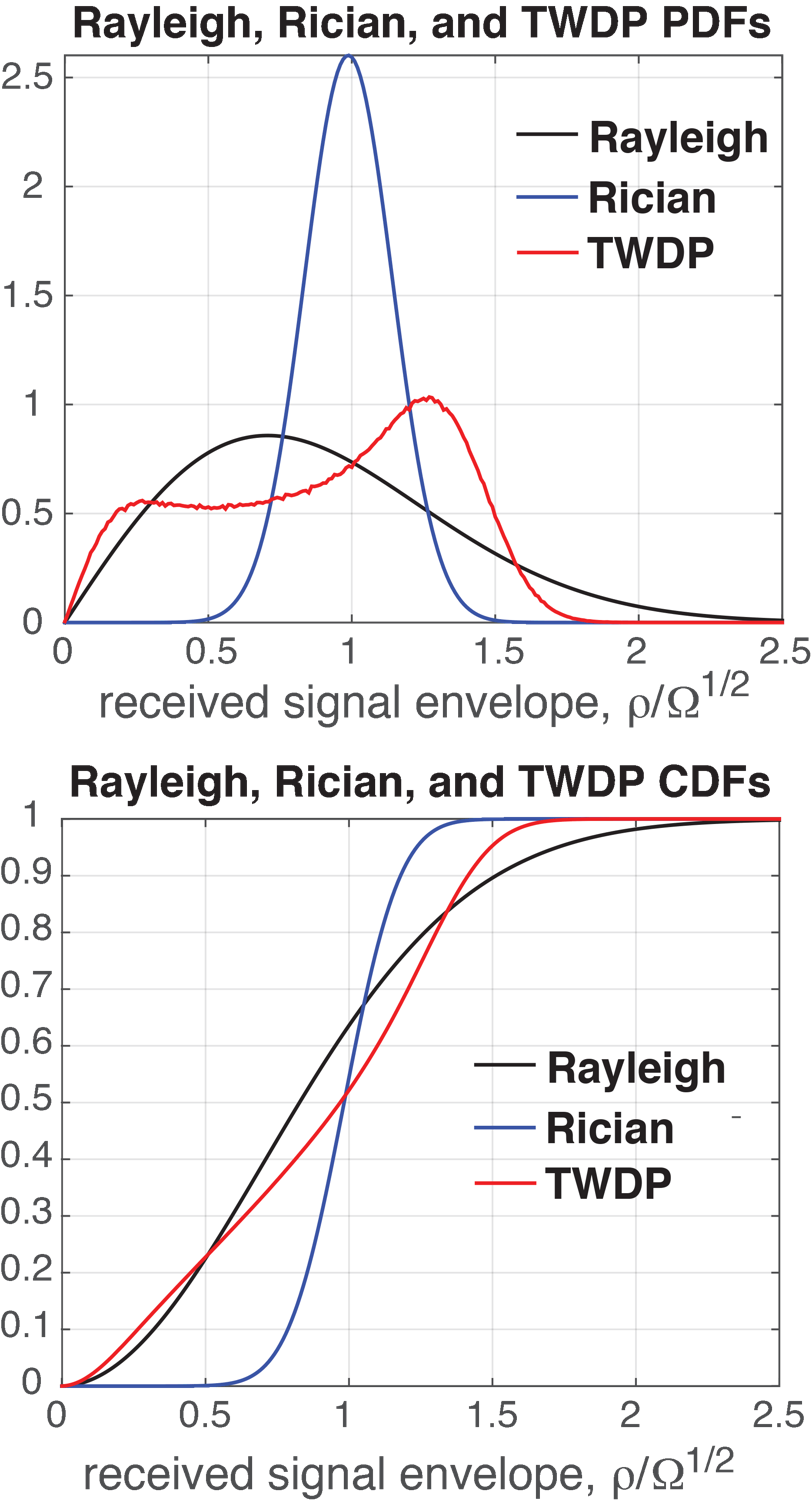
Comparison of received envelope PDFs and CDFs for Rayleigh, Rician (K=13 dB), and TWDP (K=13 dB, Δ=1) fading.

TWDP fading arises in a radio channel characterized by two constant-amplitude waves and numerous, smaller radio waves that are randomly phased with respect to one another. A TWDP-distributed envelope R follows from the following combination of elementary random variables:

$$R = \left\|V_1e^{j2\pi U_1} + V_2e^{j2\pi U_2} + X + jY\right\|$$

where $U_1$ and $U_2$ are independent uniform random variables over the interval [0,1); $X$ and $Y$ are independent, zero-mean Gaussian random variables with standard deviation $\sigma$. The two constant amplitude components $V_1, V_2$ are referred to as the specular components of the fading model. The $X+jY$ term is referred to as the diffused component and represents the sum of numerous amplitudes and phases of smaller waves, which by the law of large numbers follows a complex Gaussian distribution.

TWDP fading PDF is characterized by three physically intuitive parameters:

| average power: | $\Omega = V_1^2 + V_2^2 + 2\sigma^2$ |
| specular-to-diffuse power ratio: | $K = \frac{V_1^2 + V_2^2}{2\sigma^2}$ |
| specular peak-to-average power ratio: | $\Delta = \frac{2V_1V_2}{V_1^2 + V_2^2}$ |

In the limit of these parameters, TWDP reduces to the well known Rayleigh and Rician fading models. Specifically, notice that $K$ may vary from 0 to $\infty$. At $K=0$, TWDP model has no specular wave present and reduces to the Rayleigh fading model. At $K=\infty$, the model corresponds to the type of two-wave envelope fading experienced on a transmission line with reflections. Similarly, $\Delta$ may vary from 0 to 1. At $\Delta=0$, at most one specular wave is present and TDWP reduces to the Rician fading model. At $\Delta=1$, TDWP model contains two specular components of equal amplitude, $V_1=V_2$.

Unlike its special cases of Rayleigh and Rician fading, there is no simple, closed-form solution for the probability density function (PDF) of received envelope for TWDP fading. Instead, the exact PDF is the result of the following definite integral:

$$f_R(\rho) = \rho \int_0^\infty  J_0(\rho\nu) J_0(V_1\nu) J_0(V_2\nu) e^{-\frac{\nu^2 \sigma^2}{2}}\, \nu \, d\nu$$

Numerous techniques have been proposed to approximate the TWDP PDF in closed form or evaluate its statistics directly.
