= Rice's formula =

Formula in probability theory

In probability theory, Rice's formula, also known as Kac–Rice formula, counts the average number of times an ergodic stationary process X(t) per unit time crosses a fixed level u. Adler and Taylor describe the result as "one of the most important results in the applications of smooth stochastic processes." The formula is often used in engineering.

== History ==
The formula was published by Stephen O. Rice in 1944, having previously been discussed in his 1936 note entitled "Singing Transmission Lines." Mark Kac independently found the formula in 1943 while studying random polynomials.

== Formula ==
Write D_{u} for the number of times the ergodic stationary stochastic process x(t) takes the value u in a unit of time (i.e. t ∈ [0,1]). Then Rice's formula states that

$$\mathbb E(D_u) = \int_{-\infty}^\infty |x'|p(u,x') \, \mathrm{d}x'$$

where p(x,x') is the joint probability density of the x(t) and its mean-square derivative x'(t).

If the process x(t) is a Gaussian process and u = 0 then the formula simplifies significantly to give

$$\mathbb E(D_0) = \frac{1}{\pi} \sqrt{-\rho''(0)}$$

where ρ″ is the second derivative of the normalised autocorrelation of x(t) at 0.

== Uses ==
Rice's formula can be used to approximate an excursion probability

$$\mathbb P \left\{ \sup_{t\in[0,1]} X(t) \geq u \right\}$$

as for large values of u the probability that there is a level crossing is approximately the probability of reaching that level.
