= Cindy Greenwood =

Canadian statistician

Priscilla E. (Cindy) Greenwood (born 1937) is a Canadian mathematician who is a professor emeritus of mathematics at the University of British Columbia. She is known for her research in probability theory.

== Education and career ==
Greenwood graduated from Duke University with a B.A. in 1959. She began her graduate studies in operations research at the Massachusetts Institute of Technology, where she became exposed to probability theory through a course on stochastic processes offered in 1960 by Henry McKean. Soon afterwards, she switched to the University of Wisconsin–Madison, where she completed her Ph.D. in 1963 under the supervision of Joshua Chover. She taught for two years at North Carolina College before moving to the University of British Columbia in 1966. She has also been associated with Arizona State University, as a visiting professor from 2000 to 2003 and since 2004 as a research professor.

== Research ==
Greenwood's research in the 1970s concerned Brownian motion, Lévy processes, and Wiener–Hopf factorization. During this method she developed the theory of the martintote, a process similar to a martingale used to study asymptotic properties of processes.

In the 1980s Greenwood began working with Ed Perkins on nonstandard analysis, which they used to study local time and excursions. In this timeframe she also began working on set-indexed processes, a topic that would lead her to the theory of random fields, and on semimartingales. She traveled to Russia, and wrote a monograph on chi-squared tests with Mikhail Nikulin.

In 1990 she and Igor Evstigneev wrote a second monograph, on random fields. Her research in this period also concerned metric entropy and asymptotic efficiency. She began her work in biostatistics, involving studies of different mammalian populations, and led a major study on statistical estimation near critical points of a parameter.

Beginning in 2000, at Arizona State, she studied pink noise and stochastic resonance, which she applied to epidemic models in biostatistics as well as to the firing patterns of neurons.

== Awards and honours ==
Greenwood was elected as a fellow of the Institute of Mathematical Statistics in 1985. She won the Krieger–Nelson Prize of the Canadian Mathematical Society in 2002.

== Books ==
- Contiguity and the statistical invariance principle (with A. N. Shiryayev, Gordon & Breach, 1985)
- Markov fields over countable partially ordered sets: extrema and splitting (with I. V. Evstigneev, Memoirs of the American Mathematical Society 112, American Mathematical Society, 1994)
- A guide to chi-squared testing (with Mikhail S. Nikulin, Wiley, 1996)
- Stochastic neuron models (with Lawrence M. Ward, Mathematical Biosciences Institute Lecture Series, Springer, 2016)
