= Rayleigh fading =

Radio signal statistical model

Rayleigh fading is a statistical model for the effect of a propagation environment on a radio signal, such as that used by Wireless devices.

Rayleigh fading models assume that the magnitude of a signal that has passed through such a transmission medium (also called a communication channel) will vary randomly, or fade, according to a Rayleigh distribution — the radial component of the sum of two uncorrelated Gaussian random variables.

Rayleigh fading is viewed as a reasonable model for tropospheric and ionospheric signal propagation as well as the effect of heavily built-up urban environments on radio signals. Rayleigh fading is most applicable when there is no dominant propagation along a line of sight between the transmitter and receiver. If there is a dominant line of sight, Rician fading may be more applicable. Rayleigh fading is a special case of two-wave with diffuse power (TWDP) fading.

== The model ==
Rayleigh fading is a reasonable model when there are many objects in the environment that scatter the radio signal before it arrives at the receiver. The central limit theorem holds that, if there is sufficiently much scatter, the channel impulse response will be well-modelled as a Gaussian process irrespective of the distribution of the individual components. If there is no dominant component to the scatter, then such a process will have zero mean and phase evenly distributed between 0 and 2π radians. The envelope of the channel response will therefore be Rayleigh distributed.

Calling this random variable $R$, it will have a probability density function:

$$p_R(r) = \frac{2r} \Omega e^{-r^2/\Omega},\ r\geq 0$$

where $\Omega = \operatorname E(R^2)$.

Often, the gain and phase elements of a channel's distortion are conveniently represented as a complex number. In this case, Rayleigh fading is exhibited by the assumption that the real and imaginary parts of the response are modelled by independent and identically distributed zero-mean Gaussian processes so that the amplitude of the response is the sum of two such processes.

=== Applicability ===
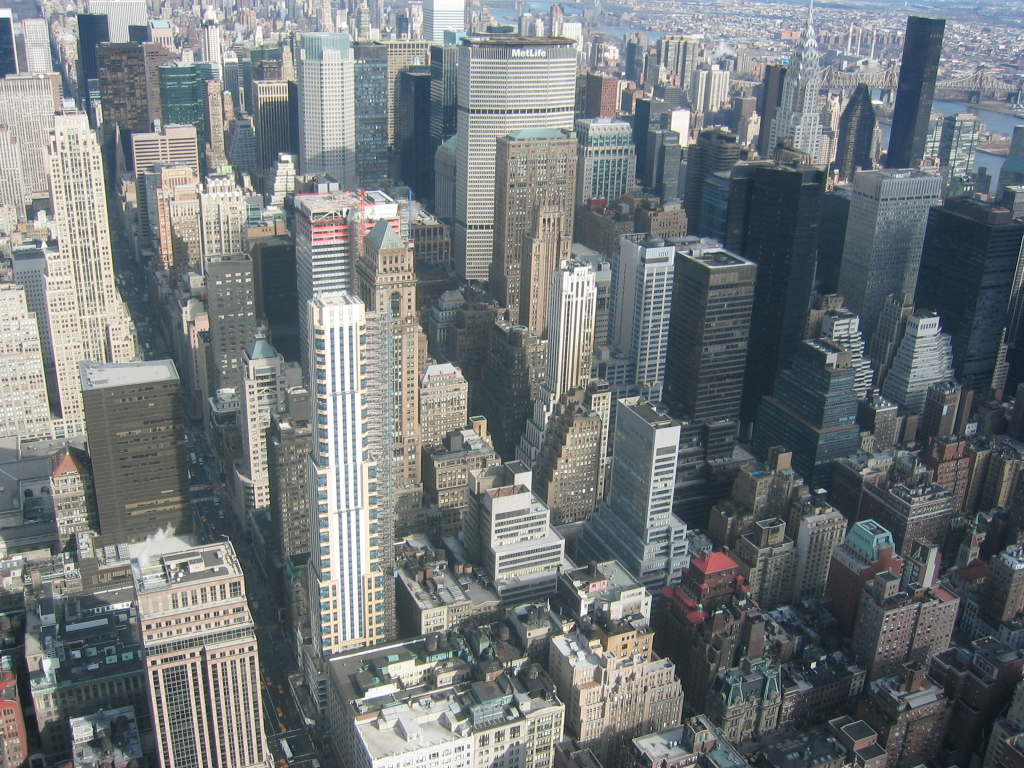
Densely built Manhattan has been shown to approach a Rayleigh-fading environment.

One second of Rayleigh fading with a maximum Doppler shift of 10 Hz

One second of Rayleigh fading with a maximum Doppler shift of 100 Hz

The requirement that there be many scatterers present means that Rayleigh fading can be a useful model in heavily built-up city centres where there is no line of sight between the transmitter and receiver and many buildings and other objects attenuate, reflect, refract, and diffract the signal. Experimental work in Manhattan has found near-Rayleigh fading there. In tropospheric and ionospheric signal propagation the many particles in the atmospheric layers act as scatterers and this kind of environment may also approximate Rayleigh fading. If the environment is such that, in addition to the scattering, there is a strongly dominant signal seen at the receiver, usually caused by a line of sight, then the mean of the random process will no longer be zero, varying instead around the power-level of the dominant path. Such a situation may be better modelled as Rician fading.

Note that Rayleigh fading is a small-scale effect. There will be bulk properties of the environment such as path loss and shadowing upon which the fading is superimposed.

How rapidly the channel fades will be affected by how fast the receiver and/or transmitter are moving. Motion causes Doppler shift in the received signal components. The figures show the power variation over 1 second of a constant signal after passing through a single-path Rayleigh fading channel with a maximum Doppler shift of 10 Hz and 100 Hz. These Doppler shifts correspond to velocities of about 6 km/h (4 mph) and 60 km/h (40 mph) respectively at 1800 MHz, one of the operating frequencies for GSM mobile phones. This is the classic shape of Rayleigh fading. Note in particular the 'deep fades' where signal strength can drop by a factor of several thousand, or 30–40 dB.

== Properties ==
Since it is based on a well-studied distribution with special properties, the Rayleigh distribution lends itself to analysis, and the key features that affect the performance of a wireless network have analytic expressions.

Note that the parameters discussed here are for a non-static channel. If a channel is not changing with time, it does not fade and instead remains at some particular level. Separate instances of the channel in this case will be uncorrelated with one another, owing to the assumption that each of the scattered components fades independently. Once relative motion is introduced between any of the transmitter, receiver, and scatterers, the fading becomes correlated and varying in time.

=== Level crossing rate ===
The level crossing rate is a measure of the rapidity of the fading. It quantifies how often the fading crosses some threshold, usually in the positive-going direction. For Rayleigh fading, the level crossing rate is:

$$\mathrm{LCR} = \sqrt{2\pi}f_d\rho e^{-\rho^2}$$

where $f_d$ is the maximum Doppler shift and $\,\!\rho$ is the threshold level normalised to the root mean square (RMS) signal level:

$$\rho = \frac{R_\mathrm{threshold}}{R_\mathrm{rms}}.$$

=== Average fade duration ===
The average fade duration quantifies how long the signal spends below the threshold $\,\!\rho$. For Rayleigh fading, the average fade duration is:

$$\mathrm{AFD} = \frac{e^{\rho^2}-1}{\rho f_d \sqrt{2\pi}}.$$

The level crossing rate and average fade duration taken together give a useful means of characterizing the severity of the fading over time.

For a particular normalized threshold value $\rho$, the product of the average fade duration and the level crossing rate is a constant and is given by

$$\mathrm{AFD} \times \mathrm{LCR} = 1 - e^{-\rho^2}.$$

=== Doppler power spectral density ===
The normalized Doppler power spectrum of Rayleigh fading with a maximum Doppler shift of 10 Hz

The Doppler power spectral density of a fading channel describes how much spectral broadening it causes. This shows how a pure frequency, e.g., a pure sinusoid, which is an impulse in the frequency domain, is spread out across frequency when it passes through the channel. It is the Fourier transform of the time-autocorrelation function. For Rayleigh fading with a vertical receive antenna with equal sensitivity in all directions, this has been shown to be:

$$S(\nu) = \frac{1}{\pi f_d \sqrt{1 - \left(\frac \nu {f_d}\right)^2}},$$

where $\,\!\nu$ is the frequency shift relative to the carrier frequency. This equation is valid only for values of $\,\!\nu$ between $\pm f_d$; the spectrum is zero outside this range. This spectrum is shown in the figure for a maximum Doppler shift of 10 Hz. The 'bowl shape' or 'bathtub shape' is the classic form of this Doppler spectrum.

== Generating Rayleigh fading ==
As described above, a Rayleigh fading channel itself can be modelled by generating the real and imaginary parts of a complex number according to independent normal Gaussian variables. However, it is sometimes the case that it is simply the amplitude fluctuations that are of interest (such as in the figure shown above). There are two main approaches to this. In both cases, the aim is to produce a signal that has the Doppler power spectrum given above and the equivalent autocorrelation properties.

=== Jakes's model ===
In his book, Jakes popularised a model for Rayleigh fading based on summing sinusoids. Let the scatterers be uniformly distributed around a circle at angles $\alpha_n$ with $k$ rays emerging from each scatterer. The Doppler shift on ray $n$ is

$$\,\!f_n = f_d\cos\alpha_n$$

and, with $M$ such scatterers, the Rayleigh fading of the $k^\text{th}$ waveform over time $t$ can be modelled as:

$$\begin{align}
R(t,k) = 2\sqrt{2}\left[\sum_{n=1}^M \right. & \left(\cos\beta_n + j\sin\beta_n\right)\cos\left(2 \pi f_n t + \theta_{n,k}\right) \\[4pt]
& \left. {} + \frac 1 {\sqrt{2}} \left(\cos\alpha + j\sin\alpha\right)\cos(2 \pi f_d t)\right].
\end{align}$$

Here, $\,\!\alpha$ and the $\,\!\beta_n$ and $\,\!\theta_{n,k}$ are model parameters with $\,\!\alpha$ usually set to zero, $\,\!\beta_n$ chosen so that there is no cross-correlation between the real and imaginary parts of $R(t)$:

$$\,\!\beta_n = \frac{\pi n}{M+1}$$

and $\,\!\theta_{n,k}$ used to generate multiple waveforms. If a single-path channel is being modelled, so that there is only one waveform then $\,\!\theta_n$ can be zero. If a multipath, frequency-selective channel is being modelled so that multiple waveforms are needed, Jakes suggests that uncorrelated waveforms are given by

$$\theta_{n,k} = \beta_n + \frac{2\pi(k-1)}{M+1}.$$

In fact, it has been shown that the waveforms are correlated among themselves — they have non-zero cross-correlation — except in special circumstances. The model is also deterministic (it has no random element to it once the parameters are chosen). A modified Jakes's model chooses slightly different spacings for the scatterers and scales their waveforms using Walsh–Hadamard sequences to ensure zero cross-correlation. Setting

$$\alpha_n = \frac{\pi(n-0.5)}{2M} \text{ and }\beta_n = \frac{\pi n} M,$$

results in the following model, usually termed the Dent model or the modified Jakes model:

$$R(t,k) = \sqrt{\frac 2 M} \sum_{n=1}^M A_k(n)\left( \cos\beta_n + j\sin\beta_n \right)\cos\left(2\pi f_d t \cos\alpha_n + \theta_n\right).$$

The weighting functions $A_k(n)$ are the $k$^{th} Walsh–Hadamard sequence in $n$. Since these have zero cross-correlation by design, this model results in uncorrelated waveforms. The phases $\,\!\theta_n$ can be initialised randomly and have no effect on the correlation properties. The fast Walsh transform can be used to efficiently generate samples using this model.

The Jakes's model also popularised the Doppler spectrum associated with Rayleigh fading, and, as a result, this Doppler spectrum is often termed Jakes's spectrum.

=== Filtered white noise ===
Another way to generate a signal with the required Doppler power spectrum is to pass a white Gaussian noise signal through a Gaussian filter with a frequency response equal to the square-root of the Doppler spectrum required. Although simpler than the models above, and non-deterministic, it presents some implementation questions related to needing high-order filters to approximate the irrational square-root function in the response and sampling the Gaussian waveform at an appropriate rate.

=== Butterworth filter as Doppler power spectral density ===
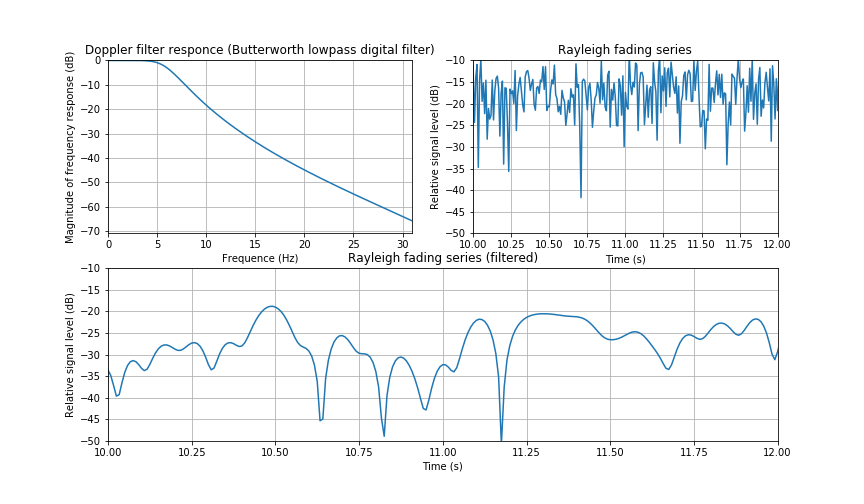
Filtered by Butterworth filter Rayleigh time series (Sampling frequency is 120 Hz.)

According to Doppler PSD can also be modeled via Butterworth filter as:

$$S_{Doppler}(f) = |H_{Butterworth}|^2 = \frac{B}{\sqrt{1 - (f/f_0)^{2k}}}$$

where f is a frequency, $H_{Butterworth}$ is the Butterworth filter response, B is the normalization constant, k is the filter order and $f_0$ is the Cutoff frequency which should be selected with respect to maximum Doppler shift.

== See also ==
- Fading
- Rayleigh scattering
- Rician fading
- Non-line-of-sight propagation
- Line-of-sight propagation
- Wireless
- Rayleigh distribution
- Two-wave with diffuse power (TWDP) fading
- Lord Rayleigh
