= Airplane scatter =

Radio frequency propagation

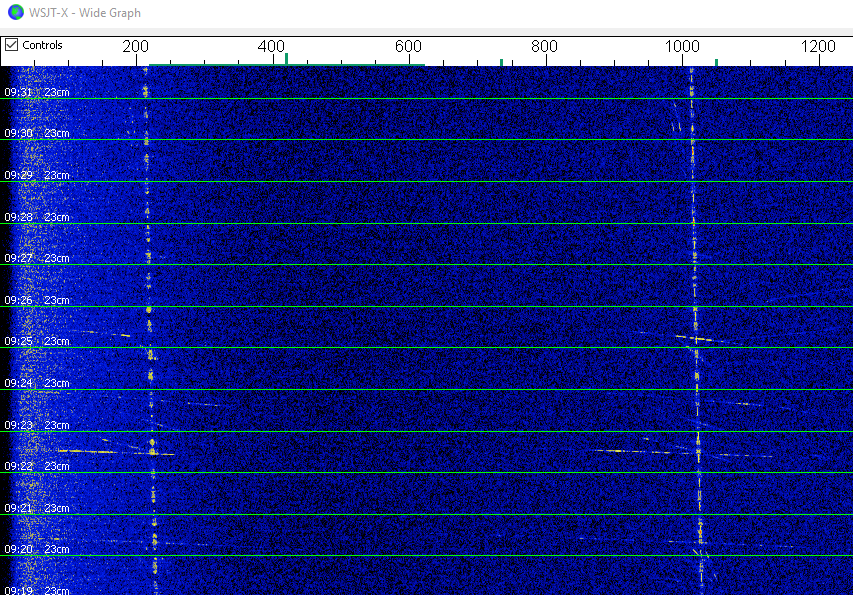

Airplane scattering (or most often reflection) refers to the reflection of a radio signal by the metal structure of a passing aircraft. It is observed on radio waves from high frequency to VHF through to microwaves and, besides back-scattering, yields momentary propagation up to 800 kilometers (500 miles) even in mountainous terrain. The most common back-scatter applications are air-traffic radar, bistatic forward-scatter guided-missile and airplane-detecting trip-wire radar, and the US space radar.

It is also a less common propagation mode used by radio amateurs.

== History ==
Airplane scatter itself had been discovered in 1930, but radio amateur usage lagged until the late 1980s. The advent of inexpensive SDR based and distributed real time flight tracking enabled precise scheduling, increasing feasibility.

== Radio amateur usage ==
Compared to a single trail of meteor scatter, the time of opening caused by a single airplane is longer – it can be from 30 seconds up to a few minutes. Slight asymmetry can sometimes be encountered both in terms of exact timing and the gain of the path.

Range and possible contact lengths are affected by the size of the plane, flight level and the approximate crossing time of the central part of the straight line between the two communicating stations.

Both the onset and decay of the channel is rapid, so to improve success rate, a short contact procedure is used.

Contact opportunities can be predicted based on the precise flight paths of surrounding planes. There exists software for prediction using local (Mode S and ADS-B) or online sources.

Microwave access using high gain antennas needs to consider precise aiming that takes into account elevation angles as well.

== See also ==
- Meteor burst communications
- Tropospheric scatter
