= Andrés Lewin-Richter Ossiander =

Spanish composer

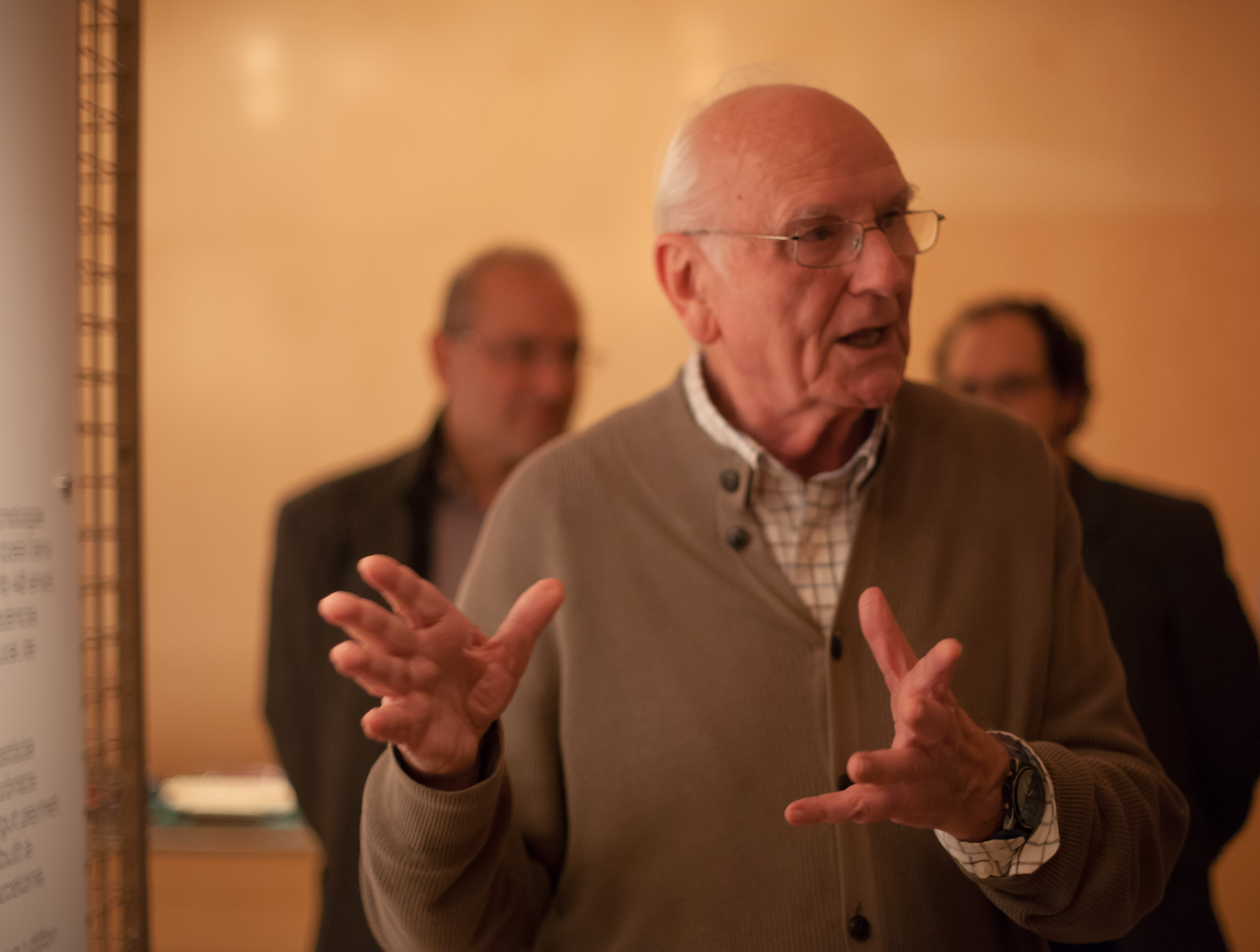
Andrés Lewin-Richter in the exhibition "Phonos, 40 anys de música electrònica a Barcelona", at Museu de la Música de Barcelona

Andrés Lewin-Richter Osiander (born 1937) is a Spanish composer of electronic music.

== Background ==
Born in Miranda de Ebro, Spain, he began his studies in engineering at Polytechnic University of Catalonia in 1955. Seven years later, he received a Fulbright Fellowship to continue his studies at Columbia University in New York to study with Vladimir Ussachevsky, Mario Davidovsky and Edgard Varèse. While there, he worked as a teaching assistant in the Columbia Princeton Electronic Music Center and composed music for the film “The Gondola Eye” by Ian Hugo and as a sound engineer at the Alwin Nikolais Dance Company.

In 1966 Lewin-Richter founded the Estudio de Música Electrónica del Conservatorio de Música in Mexico City.

In 1968, he returned to Spain and established the Barcelona Electronic Music Studio. He then widened his scope by becoming a founding member -together with Josep Mestres Quadreny and Lluís Callejo i Creus- and vice-president of the Phonos Electronic Music Studio in 1973. He has served as artistic and executive director for the music ensemble Conjunt Català de Música Contemporània (1968-1973).

Always centering on electronic methods, his work has used tape, other instruments combined with tape, and instrumental collage techniques. Many of his pieces also use voice in a prominent role and have been used for dance, theater and cinema. Two of his most influential recordings are Musica Electroacustica and Secuencia III Para Anna, both issued on the Hemisferio label. Rich notes, His skillful use of gradual phase lag has led to some of his major achievements, bringing great beauty and expressiveness to his music. He has toured the world performing, lecturing, teaching and beginning electronic music studios. Since 2003, Lewin-Richter has been a professor of electronic music history at the Universitat Pompeu Fabra and the Escola Superior de Música de Catalunya de Barcelona.

== Additional reading ==
- Urbelz Aja, Inés, “Lewin-Richter Ossiander, Andrés,” in Diccionario de la Música Española e Hispanoamerican, 2d ed. (Madrid, Spain 2000) 6:904-906.
- Lewin-Richter, Andrés . 2004. Autobiography of Andrés Lewin-Richter. Personal Website. https://web.archive.org/web/20070818111818/http://www.iua.upf.es/~alewin/biography.htm (accessed September 3, 2008).
- Llanas Rich, Albert, "Lewin-Richter, Andrés," in The New Grove Dictionary of Music and Musicians, 2d ed. (London: Macmillan, 2001), 14:617.
- Unknown. 2006. Biography of Andrés Lewin-Richter. CDEmusic. https://web.archive.org/web/20081113043257/http://www.cdemusic.org/artists/lewinrichter.html (accessed September 3, 2008).
