= Stephen O. Rice =

American electrical engineer (1907–1986)

Stephen Oswald Rice (November 29, 1907 – November 18, 1986) was a pioneer in the related fields of information theory, communications theory, and telecommunications.

== Biography ==
Rice was born in Shedds, Oregon (later renamed Shedd).

He received a bachelor's degree in electrical engineering from Oregon State University and did graduate work at Caltech and at Columbia University. He worked for nearly forty years at Bell Labs. At Bell Labs, Rice discovered the Rice distribution and Rice's formula. In 1957–58, he was a visiting professor at Harvard University.

His paper “Mathematical Analysis of Random Noise”, published in the Bell System Technical Journal divided over two issues, is considered as a classic reference in its field.

He died in La Jolla, California.

== Awards and honors ==
- He was elected to member of the National Academy of Engineering in 1977.
- In 1983 he was awarded the IEEE Alexander Graham Bell Medal.
- The IEEE Communications Society named a paper prize after him: the Stephen O. Rice Prize for best paper in the field of communications theory.

Awards
| Preceded by Harold Rosen | IEEE Alexander Graham Bell Medal; 1983 | Succeeded by Andrew Viterbi |
