= Excursion probability =

In probability theory, an excursion probability is the probability that a stochastic process surpasses a given value in a fixed time period. It is the probability

$$\mathbb P \left\{ \sup_{t \in T} f(t) \geq u \right\}.$$

Numerous approximation methods for the situation where u is large and f(t) is a Gaussian process have been proposed such as Rice's formula. First-excursion probabilities can be used to describe deflection to a critical point experienced by structures during "random loadings, such as earthquakes, strong gusts, hurricanes, etc."
