= Effect size =

Statistical measure of the magnitude of a phenomenon

In statistics, an effect size is a quantitative measure of the magnitude and often direction of a phenomenon. It can refer to the value of a statistic calculated from a sample of data, the value of one parameter for a hypothetical population, or the equation that operationalizes how statistics or parameters lead to the effect size value. Examples of effect sizes include the correlation between two variables, the regression coefficient in a regression, the mean difference, the standardised mean differences, and the risk of a particular event (such as a heart attack). Effect sizes are a complementary tool for statistical hypothesis testing, and play an important role in statistical power analyses to assess the sample size required for new experiments. Effect size calculations are fundamental to meta-analysis, which aims to provide the combined effect size based on data from multiple studies. The group of data-analysis methods concerning effect sizes is referred to as estimation statistics.

Effect size is an essential component in the evaluation of the strength of a statistical claim, and it is the first item (magnitude) in the MAGIC criteria. The standard error of the effect size is of critical importance, as it indicates how much uncertainty is included in the observed measurement. A standard deviation that is too large will make the measurement nearly meaningless. In meta-analysis, which aims to summarize multiple effect sizes into a single estimate, the uncertainty in studies' effect sizes is used to weight the contribution of each study, so larger studies are considered more important than smaller ones. The uncertainty in the effect size is calculated differently for each type of effect size, but generally only requires knowing the study's sample size (N), or the number of observations (n) in each group.

Reporting effect sizes or estimates thereof (effect estimate [EE], estimate of effect) is considered good practice when presenting empirical research findings in many fields. The reporting of effect sizes facilitates the interpretation of the importance of a research result, in contrast to its statistical significance. Effect sizes are particularly significant in social science and medical research, with the latter emphasizing the importance of the magnitude of the average treatment effect.

Effect sizes may be measured in relative or absolute terms. In relative effect sizes, two groups are directly compared with each other, as in odds ratios and relative risks. A larger absolute value always indicates a stronger effect for absolute effect sizes. Many types of measurements can be expressed as either absolute or relative, and these can be used together because they convey different information. A prominent task force in the psychology research community made the following recommendation:

Always present effect sizes for primary outcomes...If the units of measurement are meaningful on a practical level (e.g., number of cigarettes smoked per day), then we usually prefer an unstandardized measure (regression coefficient or mean difference) to a standardized measure (r or d).

== Overview ==
=== Population and sample effect sizes ===
As in statistical estimation, the true effect size is distinguished from the observed effect size. For example, to measure the risk of disease in a population (the population effect size) one can measure the risk within a sample of that population (the sample effect size). Conventions for describing true and observed effect sizes follow standard statistical practices—one common approach is to use Greek letters like ρ [rho] to denote population parameters and Latin letters like r to denote the corresponding statistic. Alternatively, a "hat" can be placed over the population parameter to denote the statistic, e.g. with $\hat\rho$ being the estimate of the parameter $\rho$.

As in any statistical setting, effect sizes are estimated with sampling error, and may be biased unless the effect size estimator that is used is appropriate for the manner in which the data were sampled and the manner in which the measurements were made. An example of this is publication bias, which occurs when scientists report results only when the estimated effect sizes are large or are statistically significant. As a result, if many researchers carry out studies with low statistical power, the reported effect sizes will tend to be larger than the true (population) effects, if any. Another example where effect sizes may be distorted is in a multiple-trial experiment, where the effect size calculation is based on the averaged or aggregated response across the trials.

Smaller studies sometimes show different, often larger, effect sizes than larger studies. This phenomenon is known as the small-study effect, which may signal publication bias.

=== Relationship to test statistics ===
Sample-based effect sizes are distinguished from test statistics used in hypothesis testing, in that they estimate the strength (magnitude) of, for example, an apparent relationship, rather than assigning a significance level reflecting whether the magnitude of the relationship observed could be due to chance. The effect size does not directly determine the significance level, or vice versa. When the population effect is nonzero it can be detected with a sufficiently large sample, and even if it is zero then it will show statistical significance at the rate of the Type I error used. For example, a sample Pearson correlation coefficient of 0.01 is statistically significant if the sample size is 1000. Reporting only the significant p-value from this analysis could be misleading if a correlation of 0.01 is too small to be of interest in a particular application.

=== Standardized and unstandardized effect sizes ===
The term effect size can refer to a standardized measure of effect (such as r, Cohen's d, or the odds ratio), or to an unstandardized measure (e.g., the difference between group means or the unstandardized regression coefficients). Standardized effect size measures are typically used when:

- the metrics of variables being studied do not have intrinsic meaning (e.g., a score on a personality test on an arbitrary scale),
- results from multiple studies are being combined,
- some or all of the studies use different scales, or
- it is desired to convey the size of an effect relative to the variability in the population.

In meta-analyses, standardized effect sizes are used as a common measure that can be calculated for different studies and then combined into an overall summary.

Unstandardized effects are also known as simple effects.

== Interpretation ==
The interpretation of an effect size of being small, medium, or large depends on its substantive context and its operational definition. Jacob Cohen suggested interpretation guidelines that are near ubiquitous across many fields. However, Cohen also cautioned:

"The terms 'small,' 'medium,' and 'large' are relative, not only to each other, but to the area of behavioral science or even more particularly to the specific content and research method being employed in any given investigation... In the face of this relativity, there is a certain risk inherent in offering conventional operational definitions for these terms for use in power analysis in as diverse a field of inquiry as behavioral science. This risk is nevertheless accepted in the belief that more is to be gained than lost by supplying a common conventional frame of reference which is recommended for use only when no better basis for estimating the ES index is available." (p. 25)

Sawilowsky recommended that the rules of thumb for effect sizes should be revised, and expanded the descriptions to include very small, very large, and huge. Funder and Ozer suggested that effect sizes should be interpreted based on benchmarks and consequences of findings, resulting in adjustment of guideline recommendations.

Lenth noted for a medium effect size, "you'll choose the same n regardless of the accuracy or reliability of your instrument, or the narrowness or diversity of your subjects. Clearly, important considerations are being ignored here. Researchers should interpret the substantive significance of their results by grounding them in a meaningful context or by quantifying their contribution to knowledge, and Cohen's effect size descriptions can be helpful as a starting point." Similarly, a U.S. Dept of Education sponsored report argued that the widespread indiscriminate use of Cohen's interpretation guidelines can be inappropriate and misleading. They instead suggested that norms should be based on distributions of effect sizes from comparable studies. Thus a small effect (in absolute numbers) could be considered large if the effect is larger than similar studies in the field. See Abelson's paradox and Sawilowsky's paradox for related points.

The table below contains descriptors for various magnitudes of d, r, f and omega, as initially suggested by Jacob Cohen, and later expanded by Sawilowsky, and by Funder & Ozer.

Effect size	d	r	f	omega
Very small	0.01	0.005	0.005	
Small	0.20	0.10	0.10	0.10
Medium	0.41, 0.50	0.20, 0.24	0.20, 0.31	0.30
Large	0.63, 0.80	0.30, 0.37	0.32, 0.40	0.50
Very large	0.87, 1.20	0.40, 0.51	0.44, 0.60	
Huge	2.0	0.71	1.0	

== Types ==
About 50 to 100 different measures of effect size are known. Many effect sizes of different types can be converted to other types, as many estimate the separation of two distributions, so are mathematically related. For example, a correlation coefficient can be converted to a Cohen's d and vice versa.

=== Correlation family: Effect sizes based on "variance explained" ===
These effect sizes estimate the amount of the variance within an experiment that is "explained" or "accounted for" by the experiment's model (Explained variation).

==== Pearson r or correlation coefficient ====
Pearson's correlation, often denoted r and introduced by Karl Pearson, is widely used as an effect size when paired quantitative data are available; for instance if one were studying the relationship between birth weight and longevity. The correlation coefficient can also be used when the data are binary. Pearson's r can vary in magnitude from −1 to 1, with −1 indicating a perfect negative linear relation, 1 indicating a perfect positive linear relation, and 0 indicating no linear relation between two variables.

===== Coefficient of determination (r^{2} or R^{2}) =====
A related effect size is r^{2}, the coefficient of determination (also referred to as R^{2} or "r-squared"), calculated as the square of the Pearson correlation r. In the case of paired data, this is a measure of the proportion of variance shared by the two variables, and varies from 0 to 1. For example, with an r of 0.21 the coefficient of determination is 0.0441, meaning that 4.4% of the variance of either variable is shared with the other variable. The r^{2} is always positive, so does not convey the direction of the correlation between the two variables.

===== Eta-squared (η^{2}) =====
Eta-squared describes the ratio of variance explained in the dependent variable by a predictor while controlling for other predictors, making it analogous to the r^{2}. Eta-squared is a biased estimator of the variance explained by the model in the population (it estimates only the effect size in the sample). This estimate shares the weakness with r^{2} that each additional variable will automatically increase the value of η^{2}. In addition, it measures the variance explained of the sample, not the population, meaning that it will always overestimate the effect size, although the bias grows smaller as the sample grows larger.
$$\eta ^2 = \frac{SS_\text{Treatment}}{SS_\text{Total}} .$$

===== Omega-squared (ω^{2}) =====
A less biased estimator of the variance explained in the population is ω^{2}
$$\omega^2 = \frac{\text{SS}_\text{treatment}-df_\text{treatment} \cdot \text{MS}_\text{error}}{\text{SS}_\text{total} + \text{MS}_\text{error}} .$$

This form of the formula is limited to between-subjects analysis with equal sample sizes in all cells. Since it is less biased (although not unbiased), ω^{2} is preferable to η^{2}; however, it can be more inconvenient to calculate for complex analyses. A generalized form of the estimator has been published for between-subjects and within-subjects analysis, repeated measure, mixed design, and randomized block design experiments. In addition, methods to calculate partial ω^{2} for individual factors and combined factors in designs with up to three independent variables have been published.

==== Cohen's f^{2} ====
Cohen's f^{2} is one of several effect size measures to use in the context of an F-test for ANOVA or multiple regression. Its amount of bias (overestimation of the effect size for the ANOVA) depends on the bias of its underlying measurement of variance explained (e.g., R^{2}, η^{2}, ω^{2}).

The f^{2} effect size measure for multiple regression is defined as:
$$f^2 = {R^2 \over 1 - R^2}.$$

Likewise, f^{2} can be defined as:
$$f^2 = {\eta^2 \over 1 - \eta^2}$$
or
$$f^2 = {\omega^2 \over 1 - \omega^2}$$
for models described by those effect size measures.

The $f^{2}$ effect size measure for sequential multiple regression and also common for PLS modeling is defined as:
$$f^2 = {R^2_{AB} - R^2_A \over 1 - R^2_{AB}}$$
where R^{2}_{A} is the variance accounted for by a set of one or more independent variables A, and R^{2}_{AB} is the combined variance accounted for by A and another set of one or more independent variables of interest B. By convention, f^{2} effect sizes of $0.1^2$, $0.25^2$, and $0.4^2$ are termed small, medium, and large, respectively.

Cohen's $\hat{f}$ can also be found for factorial analysis of variance (ANOVA) working backwards, using:
$$\hat{f}_\text{effect} = {\sqrt{(F_\text{effect} df_\text{effect}/N)}}.$$

In a balanced design (equivalent sample sizes across groups) of ANOVA, the corresponding population parameter of $f^2$ is
$${SS(\mu_1,\mu_2,\dots,\mu_K)}\over{K \times \sigma^2},$$
wherein μ_{j} denotes the population mean within the j^{th} group of the total K groups, and σ the equivalent population standard deviations within each groups. SS is the sum of squares in ANOVA.

==== Cohen's q ====
Another measure that is used with correlation differences is Cohen's q. This is the difference between two Fisher transformed Pearson regression coefficients. In symbols this is
$$q = \frac 1 2 \log \frac{ 1 + r_1 }{ 1 - r_1 } - \frac 1 2 \log \frac{1 + r_2}{1 - r_2}$$

where r_{1} and r_{2} are the regressions being compared. The expected value of q is zero and its variance is
$$\operatorname{var}(q) = \frac 1 {N_1 - 3} + \frac 1 {N_2 -3}$$
where N_{1} and N_{2} are the number of data points in the first and second regression respectively.

=== Difference family: Effect sizes based on differences between means ===
The raw effect size pertaining to a comparison of two groups is inherently calculated as the differences between the two means. However, to facilitate interpretation it is common to standardise the effect size; various conventions for statistical standardisation are presented below.

==== Standardized mean difference ====
Plots of Gaussian densities illustrating various values of Cohen's d.

A (population) effect size θ based on means usually considers the standardized mean difference (SMD) between two populations
$$\theta = \frac{\mu_1 - \mu_2} \sigma,$$
where μ_{1} is the mean for one population, μ_{2} is the mean for the other population, and σ is a standard deviation based on either or both populations.

In the practical setting the population values are typically not known and must be estimated from sample statistics. The several versions of effect sizes based on means differ with respect to which statistics are used.

This form for the effect size resembles the computation for a t-test statistic, with the critical difference that the t-test statistic includes a factor of $\sqrt{n}$. This means that for a given effect size, the significance level increases with the sample size. Unlike the t-test statistic, the effect size aims to estimate a population parameter and is not affected by the sample size.

SMD values of 0.2 to 0.5 are considered small, 0.5 to 0.8 are considered medium, and greater than 0.8 are considered large.

==== Cohen's d ====
Cohen's d is defined as the difference between two means divided by a standard deviation for the data, i.e.
$$d = \frac{\bar{x}_1 - \bar{x}_2} s.$$

Jacob Cohen defined s, the pooled standard deviation, as (for two independent samples):
$$s = \sqrt{\frac{(n_1-1)s^2_1 + (n_2-1)s^2_2}{n_1+n_2 - 2}}$$
where the variance for one of the groups is defined as
$$s_1^2 = \frac 1 {n_1-1} \sum_{i=1}^{n_1} (x_{1,i} - \bar{x}_1)^2,$$
and similarly for the other group.

Other authors choose a slightly different computation of the standard deviation when referring to "Cohen's d" where the denominator is without "-2"
$$s = \sqrt{\frac{(n_1-1)s^2_1 + (n_2-1)s^2_2}{n_1+n_2}}$$
This definition of "Cohen's d" is termed the maximum likelihood estimator by Hedges and Olkin, and it is related to Hedges' g by a scaling factor (see below).

With two paired samples, an approach is to look at the distribution of the difference scores. In that case, s is the standard deviation of this distribution of difference scores (of note, the standard deviation of difference scores is dependent on the correlation between paired samples). This creates the following relationship between the t-statistic to test for a difference in the means of the two paired groups and Cohen's d' (computed with difference scores):
$$t = \frac{\bar{X}_1 - \bar{X}_2}{\text{SE}_{diff}} = \frac{\bar{X}_1 - \bar{X}_2}{\frac{\text{SD}_{diff}}{\sqrt N}} = \frac{\sqrt{N} (\bar{X}_1 - \bar{X}_2)}{SD_{diff}}$$
and
$$d' = \frac{\bar{X}_1 - \bar{X}_2}{\text{SD}_{diff}} = \frac t {\sqrt N}$$
However, for paired samples, Cohen states that d' does not provide the correct estimate to obtain the power of the test for d, and that before looking the values up in the tables provided for d, it should be corrected for r as in the following formula:
$$\frac{d'} {\sqrt{1 - r}}.$$
where r is the correlation between paired measurements. Given the same sample size, the higher r, the higher the power for a test of paired difference.

Since d' depends on r, as a measure of effect size it is difficult to interpret; therefore, in the context of paired analyses, since it is possible to compute d' or d (estimated with a pooled standard deviation or that of a group or time-point), it is necessary to explicitly indicate which one is being reported. As a measure of effect size, d (estimated with a pooled standard deviation or that of a group or time-point) is more appropriate, for instance in meta-analysis.

Cohen's d is frequently used in estimating sample sizes for statistical testing. A lower Cohen's d indicates the necessity of larger sample sizes, and vice versa, as can subsequently be determined together with the additional parameters of desired significance level and statistical power.

==== Glass' Δ ====
In 1976, Gene V. Glass proposed an estimator of the effect size that uses only the standard deviation of the second group
$$\Delta = \frac{\bar{x}_1 - \bar{x}_2}{s_2}$$

The second group may be regarded as a control group, and Glass argued that if several treatments were compared to the control group it would be better to use just the standard deviation computed from the control group, so that effect sizes would not differ under equal means and different variances.

Under a correct assumption of equal population variances a pooled estimate for σ is more precise.

==== Hedges' g ====
Hedges' g, suggested by Larry Hedges in 1981, is like the other measures based on a standardized difference
$$g = \frac{\bar{x}_1 - \bar{x}_2}{s^*}$$
where the pooled standard deviation $s^*$ is computed as:
$$s^* = \sqrt{\frac{(n_1-1)s_1^2 + (n_2-1)s_2^2}{n_1+n_2-2}}.$$

However, as an estimator for the population effect size θ it is biased. Nevertheless, this bias can be approximately corrected through multiplication by a factor
$$g^* = J(n_1+n_2-2) \,\, g \, \approx \, \left(1-\frac{3}{4(n_1+n_2)-9}\right) \,\, g$$
Hedges and Olkin refer to this less-biased estimator $g^*$ as d, but it is not the same as Cohen's d. The exact form for the correction factor J() involves the gamma function
$$J(a) = \frac{\Gamma(a/2)}{\sqrt{a/2 \,}\,\Gamma((a-1)/2)}.$$
There are also multilevel variants of Hedges' g, e.g., for use in cluster randomised controlled trials (CRTs). CRTs involve randomising clusters, such as schools or classrooms, to different conditions and are frequently used in education research.

==== Ψ, root-mean-square standardized effect ====
A similar effect size estimator for multiple comparisons (e.g., ANOVA) is the Ψ root-mean-square standardized effect:
$$\Psi = \sqrt{ \frac{1}{k-1} \cdot \sum_{j=1}^k \left(\frac{\mu_j-\mu}{\sigma}\right)^2}$$
where k is the number of groups in the comparisons.

This essentially presents the omnibus difference of the entire model adjusted by the root mean square, analogous to d or g.

In addition, a generalization for multi-factorial designs has been provided.

==== Distribution of effect sizes based on means ====
Provided that the data is Gaussian distributed a scaled Hedges' g, $\sqrt{n_1 n_2/(n_1+n_2)}\,g$, follows a noncentral t-distribution with the noncentrality parameter $\sqrt{n_1 n_2/(n_1+n_2)}\theta$ and (n_{1} + n_{2} − 2) degrees of freedom. Likewise, the scaled Glass' Δ is distributed with n_{2} − 1 degrees of freedom.

From the distribution it is possible to compute the expectation and variance of the effect sizes.

In some cases large sample approximations for the variance are used. One suggestion for the variance of Hedges' unbiased estimator is
$$\hat{\sigma}^2(g^*) = \frac{n_1+n_2}{n_1 n_2} + \frac{(g^*)^2}{2(n_1 + n_2)}.$$

==== Strictly standardized mean difference (SSMD) ====
As a statistical parameter, SSMD (denoted as $\beta$) is defined as the ratio of mean to standard deviation of the difference of two random values respectively from two groups. Assume that one group with random values has mean $\mu_1$ and variance $\sigma_1^2$ and another group has mean $\mu_2$ and variance $\sigma_2^2$. The covariance between the two groups is $\sigma_{12}.$ Then, the SSMD for the comparison of these two groups is defined as

$$\beta =  \frac{\mu_1 - \mu_2}{\sqrt{\sigma_1^2 + \sigma_2^2 - 2\sigma_{12} }}.$$

If the two groups are independent,

$$\beta =  \frac{\mu_1 - \mu_2}{\sqrt{\sigma_1^2 + \sigma_2^2 }}.$$

If the two independent groups have equal variances $\sigma^2$,

$$\beta =  \frac{\mu_1 - \mu_2}{\sqrt{2}\sigma}.$$

==== Other metrics ====
Mahalanobis distance (D) is a multivariate generalization of Cohen's d, which takes into account the relationships between the variables.

Subin's E ($E_{HBG}$) is a bounded effect size for paired repeated-assessments data. It standardizes mean gain using a reference spread, incorporates heterogeneity in individual gain scores, and applies a bounded arctangent transformation. It is intended for within-group paired comparisons across repeated assessment occasions.

$$E_{HBG}=\frac{2}{\pi}\arctan\left(
\frac{J(\bar X_2-\bar X_1)}
{k\,S_{ref}\sqrt{1+\lambda\left(\frac{s_D}{S_{ref}}\right)^2}}
\right)$$

where

$$S_{ref}=\sqrt{\frac{s_1^2+s_2^2}{2}}.$$

In the published calibration of the method, the recommended parameter values were $\lambda = 2.8759$ and $k = 0.5069$.

Here $\bar X_1$ and $\bar X_2$ denote the means at two assessment occasions, $s_1$ and $s_2$ denote the corresponding standard deviations, $s_D$ is the standard deviation of the individual gain scores, and $J$ is a small-sample correction factor. In the practical approximation reported for the method, $J \approx 1-\frac{3}{4n-5}$.

In published calibrations, absolute values of $E_{HBG}$ have been interpreted using the following empirical bands.

Published interpretation guide for absolute values of $E_{HBG}$
Absolute value	Interpretation
0.00–0.49	Limited effect
0.50–0.64	Modest effect
0.65–0.79	Substantial effect
0.80–0.89	Strong effect
0.90–1.00	Very strong effect

=== Categorical family: Effect sizes for associations among categorical variables ===
$\varphi = \sqrt{ \frac{\chi^2}{N}}$	$\varphi_c = \sqrt{ \frac{\chi^2}{N(k - 1)}}$
Phi (φ)	Cramér's V (φ_{c})

Commonly used measures of association for the chi-squared test are the Phi coefficient and Cramér's V (sometimes referred to as Cramér's phi and denoted as φ_{c}). Phi is related to the point-biserial correlation coefficient and Cohen's d and estimates the extent of the relationship between two variables (2 × 2). Cramér's V may be used with variables having more than two levels.

Phi can be computed by finding the square root of the chi-squared statistic divided by the sample size.

Similarly, Cramér's V is computed by taking the square root of the chi-squared statistic divided by the sample size and the length of the minimum dimension (k is the smaller of the number of rows r or columns c).

φ_{c} is the intercorrelation of the two discrete variables and may be computed for any value of r or c. However, as chi-squared values tend to increase with the number of cells, the greater the difference between r and c, the more likely V will tend to 1 without strong evidence of a meaningful correlation.

==== Cohen's omega (ω) ====
Another measure of effect size used for chi-squared tests is Cohen's omega ($\omega$). This is defined as
$$\omega = \sqrt{ \sum_{i=1}^m \frac{ (p_{1i} - p_{0i})^2 }{p_{0i}} }$$
where p_{0i} is the proportion of the i^{th} cell under H_{0}, p_{1i} is the proportion of the i^{th} cell under H_{1} and m is the number of cells.

==== Odds ratio ====
The odds ratio (OR) is another useful effect size. It is appropriate when the research question focuses on the degree of association between two binary variables. For example, consider a study of spelling ability. In a control group, two students pass the class for every one who fails, so the odds of passing are two to one (or 2/1 = 2). In the treatment group, six students pass for every one who fails, so the odds of passing are six to one (or 6/1 = 6). The effect size can be computed by noting that the odds of passing in the treatment group are three times higher than in the control group (because 6 divided by 2 is 3). Therefore, the odds ratio is 3. Odds ratio statistics are on a different scale than Cohen's d, so this '3' is not comparable to a Cohen's d of 3.

==== Relative risk ====
The relative risk (RR), also called risk ratio, is simply the risk (probability) of an event relative to some independent variable. This measure of effect size differs from the odds ratio in that it compares probabilities instead of odds, but asymptotically approaches the latter for small probabilities. Using the example above, the probabilities for those in the control group and treatment group passing is 2/3 (or 0.67) and 6/7 (or 0.86), respectively. The effect size can be computed the same as above, but using the probabilities instead. Therefore, the relative risk is 1.28. Since rather large probabilities of passing were used, there is a large difference between relative risk and odds ratio. Had failure (a smaller probability) been used as the event (rather than passing), the difference between the two measures of effect size would not be so great.

While both measures are useful, they have different statistical uses. In medical research, the odds ratio is commonly used for case-control studies, as odds, but not probabilities, are usually estimated. Relative risk is commonly used in randomized controlled trials and cohort studies, but relative risk contributes to overestimations of the effectiveness of interventions.

==== Risk difference ====
The risk difference (RD), sometimes called absolute risk reduction, is simply the difference in risk (probability) of an event between two groups. It is a useful measure in experimental research, since RD tells you the extent to which an experimental interventions changes the probability of an event or outcome. Using the example above, the probabilities for those in the control group and treatment group passing is 2/3 (or 0.67) and 6/7 (or 0.86), respectively, and so the RD effect size is 0.86 − 0.67 = 0.19 (or 19%). RD is the superior measure for assessing effectiveness of interventions.

==== Cohen's h ====
One measure used in power analysis when comparing two independent proportions is Cohen's h. This is defined as follows
$$h = 2 ( \arcsin \sqrt{p_1} - \arcsin \sqrt{p_2})$$
where p_{1} and p_{2} are the proportions of the two samples being compared and arcsin is the arcsine transformation.

==== Probability of superiority ====
To more easily describe the meaning of an effect size to people outside statistics, the common language effect size, as the name implies, was designed to communicate it in plain English. It is used to describe a difference between two groups and was proposed, as well as named, by Kenneth McGraw and S. P. Wong in 1992. They used the following example (about heights of men and women): "in any random pairing of young adult males and females, the probability of the male being taller than the female is .92, or in simpler terms yet, in 92 out of 100 blind dates among young adults, the male will be taller than the female", when describing the population value of the common language effect size.

==== Effect size for ordinal data ====
Cliff's delta or $d$, originally developed by Norman Cliff for use with ordinal data, is a measure of how often the values in one distribution are larger than the values in a second distribution. Crucially, it does not require any assumptions about the shape or spread of the two distributions.

The sample estimate $d$ is given by:
$$d = \frac{\sum_{i,j} [x_i > x_j] - [x_i < x_j]}{mn}$$
where the two distributions are of size $n$ and $m$ with items $x_i$ and $x_j$, respectively, and $[\cdot]$ is the Iverson bracket, which is 1 when the contents are true and 0 when false.

$d$ is linearly related to the Mann–Whitney U statistic; however, it captures the direction of the difference in its sign. Given the Mann–Whitney $U$, $d$ is:
$$d = \frac{2U}{mn} - 1$$

==== Cohen's g ====
One of simplest effect sizes for measuring how much a proportion differs from 50% is Cohen's g. It measures how much a proportion differs from 50%. For example, if 85.2% of arrests for car theft are males, then effect size of sex on arrest when measured with Cohen's g is $g = 0.852-0.5=0.352$. In general:

$g = P - 0.50 \text{ or } 0.50 - P \quad (\text{directional}),$

$g = |P - 0.50| \quad (\text{nondirectional}).$

Units of Cohen's g are more intuitive (proportion) than in some other effect sizes. It is sometime used in combination with Binomial test.

== Confidence intervals by means of noncentrality parameters ==
Confidence intervals of standardized effect sizes, especially Cohen's ${d}$ and $f^2$, rely on the calculation of confidence intervals of noncentrality parameters (ncp). A common approach to construct the confidence interval of ncp is to find the critical ncp values to fit the observed statistic to tail quantiles α/2 and (1 − α/2). The SAS and R-package MBESS provides functions to find critical values of ncp.

=== t-test for mean difference of single group or two related groups ===
For a single group, M denotes the sample mean, μ the population mean, SD the sample's standard deviation, σ the population's standard deviation, and n is the sample size of the group. The t value is used to test the hypothesis on the difference between the mean and a baseline μ_{baseline}. Usually, μ_{baseline} is zero. In the case of two related groups, the single group is constructed by the differences in pair of samples, while SD and σ denote the sample's and population's standard deviations of differences rather than within original two groups.
$$t := \frac{M - \mu_{\text{baseline}}}{\text{SE}} = \frac{M- \mu_{\text{baseline}}}{\text{SD}/\sqrt{n}}=\frac{\sqrt{n} \left( \frac{M-\mu}{\sigma} \right) + \sqrt{n} \left( \frac{\mu-\mu_\text{baseline}}{\sigma}\right) }{\frac{\text{SD}} \sigma}$$
$$ncp=\sqrt{n} \left( \frac{\mu-\mu_\text{baseline}}{\sigma} \right)$$
and Cohen's
$$d := \frac{M-\mu_\text{baseline}}{\text{SD}}$$

is the point estimate of
$$\frac{\mu-\mu_\text{baseline}} \sigma.$$

So,

$$\tilde{d}=\frac{ncp}{\sqrt n}.$$

=== t-test for mean difference between two independent groups ===
n_{1} or n_{2} are the respective sample sizes.
$$t:=\frac{M_1-M_2}{\text{SD}_\text{within}/\sqrt{\frac{n_1 n_2}{n_1+n_2}}},$$

wherein
$$\text{SD}_\text{within}:=\sqrt{\frac{\text{SS}_\text{within}}{\text{df}_\text{within}}} = \sqrt{\frac{(n_1-1)\text{SD}_1^2+(n_2-1) \text{SD}_2^2}{n_1+n_2-2}}.$$
$$ncp=\sqrt{\frac{n_1 n_2}{n_1+n_2}}\frac{\mu_1-\mu_2} \sigma$$

and Cohen's
$$d:=\frac{M_1-M_2}{SD_\text{within}}$$
is the point estimate of $\frac{\mu_1-\mu_2} \sigma.$

So,
$$\tilde{d}=\frac{ncp}{\sqrt{\frac{n_1 n_2}{n_1+n_2}}}.$$

=== One-way ANOVA test for mean difference across multiple independent groups ===
One-way ANOVA test applies noncentral F distribution. While with a given population standard deviation $\sigma$, the same test question applies noncentral chi-squared distribution.
$$F := \frac{\frac{\text{SS}_\text{between}}{\sigma^2}/\text{df}_\text{between}}{\frac{\text{SS}_\text{within}}{\sigma^2}/\text{df}_\text{within}}$$

For each j-th sample within i-th group X_{i,j}, denote
$$M_i (X_{i,j}) := \frac{\sum_{w=1}^{n_i} X_{i,w}}{n_i};\; \mu_i (X_{i,j}) := \mu_i.$$

While,
$$\begin{align}
\text{SS}_\text{between}/\sigma^2
& = \frac{\text{SS}\left(M_i (X_{i,j}); i=1,2,\dots,K,\; j=1,2,\dots,n_{i}\right)}{\sigma^2}\\
& = \text{SS}\left(\frac{M_i(X_{i,j}-\mu_i)}{\sigma}+\frac{\mu_i}{\sigma};i=1,2,\dots,K,\; j=1,2,\dots,n_i \right)\\
& \sim \chi^2\left(\text{df}=K-1,\; ncp=SS\left(\frac{\mu_i(X_{i,j})}{\sigma};i=1,2,\dots,K,\; j=1,2,\dots,n_i\right)\right)
\end{align}$$

So, both ncp(s) of F and $\chi^2$ equate
$$\text{SS}\left(\mu_i(X_{i,j})/\sigma;i=1,2,\dots,K,\; j=1,2,\dots,n_i \right).$$

In case of $n:=n_1=n_2=\cdots=n_K$ for K independent groups of same size, the total sample size is N := n·K.
$$\text{Cohens }\tilde{f}^2 := \frac{\text{SS}(\mu_1,\mu_2, \dots ,\mu_K)}{K\cdot\sigma^2} = \frac{\text{SS} \left(\mu_i(X_{i,j})/\sigma; i=1,2,\dots,K,\; j=1,2,\dots,n_i \right)}{n\cdot K} = \frac{ncp}{n\cdot K}=\frac{ncp}N.$$

The t-test for a pair of independent groups is a special case of one-way ANOVA. Note that the noncentrality parameter $ncp_F$ of F is not comparable to the noncentrality parameter $ncp_t$ of the corresponding t. Actually, $ncp_F = ncp_t^2$, and $\tilde{f} = \left|\frac{\tilde{d}}{2}\right|$.

== See also ==
- Estimation statistics
- Statistical significance
- Z-factor, an alternative measure of effect size
