= Bradford Hill criteria =

Criteria for measuring cause and effect

In 1965 Bradford Hill presented 9 perspectives potentially contributing to evidence of a causal relationship. They are often incorrectly described as the Bradford Hill criteria, or Hill's criteria for causation. Hill's description was "nine different viewpoints from all of which we should study association before we cry causation." The group of nine principles can be useful in identifying epidemiologic evidence of a causal relationship between a potential cause and an observed effect and have been widely used in public health research. Modern interpretations of Hill's viewpoints focus on a more nuanced framing, in line with Hill's original assertion that "none of my nine viewpoints can bring indisputable evidence for or against the cause-and-effect hypothesis and none can be required as a sine qua non."

Hill's nine perspectives may contribute to the true causal criteria. For both experimental and epidemiological evidence, causal criteria exist of two requirements: 1. Observing a change in the suspected exposure being associated with a change in the outcome under study, and 2. Evidence supporting this associated event change, unlikely being the result of bias, accidental, confounding or any other reason.

Hill described epidemiological version of the first requirement with the words: “Is the frequency of the associated events affected? Here the strongest support for the causation hypothesis may be revealed.”

In a well set up experiment, the experimental conditions make associated event changes unlikely the result of any other reason but causality. The exclusion of non-causal reasons being behind the observations is more difficult in epidemiology. However, identifying bi-directionality of associated event changes may form strong support for the unlikelihood of bias, accidental, or confounding (or any other reason) being responsible for the associated event changes. Example: since causal relationships are characterised by associated event changes, if a population's tobacco rate exposure increase, is associated with an increase in the lung cancer rate, the associated event changes suggest the possibility of tobacco causing lung cancer. If the same or other populations decrease the tobacco rate exposure and this is associated with a decrease in lung cancer rates, the bi-directionality of the same association would be more difficult to explain using non-causal reasons. This would leave causality as the explanation best fitting the observations. Another way to provide a degree of exclusion of non-causal reasons being behind associated event changes, is identifying support for many different perspectives all fitting the causal hypothesis. Many different perspective supporting the causal hypothesis like the pieces of a single puzzle, also makes bias, accidental, and confounding reasons less likely responsible for the observed associated event changes.

Another consideration in epidemiology is the best chances of avoiding bias and accidental findings in causal inference evaluations, being the use of big data sets of raw non-selective long-term data. The big picture needs to confirm any interpretations from smaller pictures in order to validate the findings. Generalisations of any potentially reductionist interpretations require validation by zooming out.

In 1996, David Fredricks and David Relman remarked on Hill's criteria in their pivotal paper on microbial pathogenesis.

== Definition ==
In 1965, the English statistician Sir Austin Bradford Hill outlined a set of nine principles to consider when evaluating epidemiologic evidence of a causal relationship between an exposure and outcome. (For example, he demonstrated the connection between cigarette smoking and lung cancer). The list of principles is as follows:

1. Strength (effect size): A small association does not mean that there is not a causal effect, though the larger the association, the more likely that it is causal.
2. Consistency (reproducibility): Consistent findings observed by different persons in different places with different samples strengthens the likelihood of an effect.
3. Specificity: Causation is likely if there is a very specific population at a specific site and disease with no other likely explanation. The more specific an association between a factor and an effect is, the bigger the probability of a causal relationship.
4. Temporality: The effect has to occur after the cause (and if there is an expected delay between the cause and expected effect, then the effect must occur after that delay).
5. Biological gradient (dose–response relationship): Greater exposure should generally lead to greater incidence of the effect. However, in some cases, the mere presence of the factor can trigger the effect. In other cases, an inverse proportion is observed: greater exposure leads to lower incidence.
6. Plausibility: A plausible mechanism between cause and effect is helpful (but Hill noted that knowledge of the mechanism is limited by current knowledge).
7. Coherence: Coherence between epidemiological and laboratory findings increases the likelihood of an effect. However, Hill noted that "lack of such [laboratory] evidence cannot nullify the epidemiological effect on associations".
8. Experiment: "Occasionally it is possible to appeal to experimental evidence".
9. Analogy: The use of analogies or similarities between the observed association and any other associations.

Some authors consider, also, Reversibility: If the cause is deleted then the effect should disappear as well.

== Debate in epidemiology ==
All scientific work is incomplete. All scientific work is liable to be upset or modified by advancing knowledge. That does not confer upon us a freedom to ignore the knowledge we already have, or to postpone the action that it appears to demand at a given time.

— Bradford Hill, on the fallacy of persisting with existing research and rules.

Bradford Hill's criteria had been widely accepted as useful guidelines for investigating causality in epidemiological studies but their value has been questioned because they have become somewhat outdated.

In addition, their method of application is debated. Some proposed options how to apply them include:

1. Using a counterfactual consideration as the basis for applying each criterion.
2. Subdividing them into three categories: direct, mechanistic and parallel evidence, expected to complement each other. This operational reformulation of the criteria has been recently proposed in the context of evidence-based medicine.
3. Considering confounding factors and bias.
4. Using Hill's criteria as a guide, but not considering them to give definitive conclusions.
5. Separating causal association and interventions, because interventions in public health are more complex than can be evaluated by use of Hill's criteria

An argument against the use of Bradford Hill criteria as exclusive considerations in proving causality is that the basic mechanism of proving causality is not in applying specific criteria—whether those of Bradford Hill or counterfactual argument—but in scientific common sense deduction. Others argue that the specific study from which data has been produced is important, and while the Bradford Hill criteria may be applied to test causality in these scenarios, the study type may rule out deducing or inducing causality, and the criteria are only of use in inferring the best explanation of this data.

Debate over the scope of application of the criteria includes, whether they can be applied to social sciences. The argument proposes that there are different motives behind defining causality; the Bradford Hill criteria applied to complex systems such as health sciences are useful in prediction models where a consequence is sought; explanation models as to why causation occurred are deduced less easily from Bradford Hill criteria because the instigation of causation, rather than the consequence, is needed for these models.

== Examples of application ==
Researchers have applied Hill's criteria for causality in examining the evidence in several areas of epidemiology, including connections between exposures to molds and infant pulmonary hemorrhage, ultraviolet B radiation, vitamin D and cancer, vitamin D and pregnancy and neonatal outcomes, alcohol and cardiovascular disease outcomes, infections and risk of stroke, nutrition and biomarkers related to disease outcomes, foods and nutrients related to cardiovascular disease and diabetes and sugar-sweetened beverage consumption and the prevalence of obesity and obesity-related diseases. They have also been used in non-human epidemiological studies, such as on the effects of neonicotinoid pesticides on honey bees. Their use in quality improvement of health care services has been proposed, highlighting how quality improvement methods can be used to provide evidence for the criteria.

Since the description of the criteria, many methods to systematically evaluate the evidence supporting a causal relationship have been published, for example the five evidence-grading criteria of the World Cancer Research Fund (Convincing; Probable; Limited evidence – suggestive; Limited evidence – no conclusion; Substantial effect on risk unlikely).

== See also ==
- Causal inference – Branch of statistics
- Granger causality – Statistical hypothesis test for forecasting
- Koch's postulates – Four criteria showing a causal relationship between a causative microbe and a disease
- Public health – Promoting health through informed choices
- MAGIC criteria – Set of guidelines for using statistical analysis
- Correlation does not imply causation – Refutation of a logical fallacy
