= Noncentral beta distribution =

Probability distribution

Noncentral Beta
- Notation: Beta(α, β, λ)
- Parameters: α > 0 shape (real) β > 0 shape (real) λ ≥ 0 noncentrality (real)
- Support: $x \in [0; 1]\!$
- PDF: (type I) $\sum_{j = 0}^{\infty} e^{-\lambda/2} \frac{\left(\frac{\lambda}{2}\right)^j}{j!}\frac{x^{\alpha + j - 1}\left(1-x\right)^{\beta - 1}}{\mathrm{B}\left(\alpha + j,\beta\right)}$
- CDF: (type I) $\sum_{j = 0}^{\infty} e^{-\lambda/2} \frac{\left(\frac{\lambda}{2}\right)^j}{j!} I_x \left(\alpha + j,\beta\right)$
- Mean: (type I) $e^{-\frac{\lambda}{2}}\frac{\Gamma\left(\alpha + 1\right)}{\Gamma\left(\alpha\right)} \frac{\Gamma\left(\alpha+\beta\right)}{\Gamma\left(\alpha + \beta + 1\right)} {}_2F_2\left(\alpha+\beta,\alpha+1;\alpha,\alpha+\beta+1;\frac{\lambda}{2}\right)$ (see Confluent hypergeometric function)
- Variance: (type I) $e^{-\frac{\lambda}{2}}\frac{\Gamma\left(\alpha + 2\right)}{\Gamma\left(\alpha\right)} \frac{\Gamma\left(\alpha+\beta\right)}{\Gamma\left(\alpha + \beta + 2\right)} {}_2F_2\left(\alpha+\beta,\alpha+2;\alpha,\alpha+\beta+2;\frac{\lambda}{2}\right) - \mu^2$ where $\mu$ is the mean. (see Confluent hypergeometric function)

In probability theory and statistics, the noncentral beta distribution is a continuous probability distribution that is a noncentral generalization of the (central) beta distribution.

The noncentral beta distribution (Type I) is the distribution of the ratio

$$X = \frac{\chi^2_m(\lambda)}{\chi^2_m(\lambda) + \chi^2_n},$$

where $\chi^2_m(\lambda)$ is a noncentral chi-squared random variable with degrees of freedom m and noncentrality parameter $\lambda$, and $\chi^2_n$ is a central chi-squared random variable with degrees of freedom n, independent of $\chi^2_m(\lambda)$. In this case, $X \sim \mbox{Beta}\left(\frac{m}{2},\frac{n}{2},\lambda\right)$

A Type II noncentral beta distribution is the distribution of the ratio

$$Y = \frac{\chi^2_n}{\chi^2_n + \chi^2_m(\lambda)},$$

where the noncentral chi-squared variable is in the denominator only. If $Y$ follows the type II distribution, then $X = 1 - Y$ follows a type I distribution.

== Cumulative distribution function ==
The Type I cumulative distribution function is usually represented as a Poisson mixture of central beta random variables:

$$F(x) = \sum_{j=0}^\infty P(j) I_x(\alpha+j,\beta),$$

where λ is the noncentrality parameter, P(.) is the Poisson(λ/2) probability mass function, \alpha=m/2 and \beta=n/2 are shape parameters, and $I_x(a,b)$ is the incomplete beta function. That is,

$$F(x) = \sum_{j=0}^\infty \frac{1}{j!}\left(\frac{\lambda}{2}\right)^je^{-\lambda/2}I_x(\alpha+j,\beta).$$

The Type II cumulative distribution function in mixture form is

$$F(x) = \sum_{j=0}^\infty P(j) I_x(\alpha,\beta+j).$$

Algorithms for evaluating the noncentral beta distribution functions are given by Posten and Chattamvelli.

== Probability density function ==
The (Type I) probability density function for the noncentral beta distribution is:

$$f(x) = \sum_{j=0}^\infin \frac{1}{j!}\left(\frac{\lambda}{2}\right)^je^{-\lambda/2}\frac{x^{\alpha+j-1}(1-x)^{\beta-1}}{B(\alpha+j,\beta)}.$$

where $B$ is the beta function, $\alpha$ and $\beta$ are the shape parameters, and $\lambda$ is the noncentrality parameter. The density of Y is the same as that of 1-X with the degrees of freedom reversed.

== Related distributions ==
=== Transformations ===
If $X\sim\mbox{Beta}\left(\alpha,\beta,\lambda\right)$, then $\frac{\beta X}{\alpha (1-X)}$ follows a noncentral F-distribution with $2\alpha, 2\beta$ degrees of freedom, and non-centrality parameter $\lambda$.

If $X$ follows a noncentral F-distribution $F_{\mu_{1}, \mu_{2}}\left( \lambda \right)$ with $\mu_{1}$ numerator degrees of freedom and $\mu_{2}$ denominator degrees of freedom, then

$$Z = \cfrac{\cfrac{\mu_{2}}{\mu_{1}}}{\cfrac{\mu_{2}}{\mu_{1}} + X^{-1} }$$

follows a noncentral Beta distribution:

$$Z \sim \mbox{Beta}\left(\frac{1}{2}\mu_{1},\frac{1}{2}\mu_{2},\lambda\right)$$.

This is derived from making a straightforward transformation.

=== Special cases ===
When $\lambda = 0$, the noncentral beta distribution is equivalent to the (central) beta distribution.
