= Abelson's paradox =

Statistical paradox

Abelson's paradox is an applied statistics paradox identified by Robert P. Abelson. The paradox pertains to a possible paradoxical relationship between the magnitude of the r^{2} (i.e., coefficient of determination) effect size and its practical meaning.

Abelson's example was obtained from the analysis of the r^{2} of batting average in baseball and skill level. Although batting average is considered among the most significant characteristics necessary for success, the effect size was only a tiny 0.003.

== See also ==
- List of paradoxes
