= Robert Abelson =

American psychologist (1928–2005)

Robert P. Abelson
- Born: September 12, 1928; New York City, U.S.
- Died: July 13, 2005 (aged 76)
- Education: Massachusetts Institute of Technology (B.S.); Princeton University (Ph.D.)
- Known for: Scripts, Plans, Goals, and Understanding; Attitude theory; Abelson's paradox; MAGIC criteria
- Awards: APA Distinguished Scientific Contribution Award; Fellow of the American Academy of Arts and Sciences (1978)
- Scientific career
- Fields: Psychology; Political science; Statistics
- Institutions: Yale University
- Doctoral advisor: John Tukey; Silvan Tomkins

Robert Paul Abelson (September 12, 1928 – July 13, 2005) was a Yale University psychologist and political scientist with special interests in statistics and logic.

== Early life and education ==
He was born in New York City and attended the Bronx High School of Science. He did his undergraduate work at MIT and his Ph.D. in psychology at Princeton University's Department of Psychology under John Tukey and Silvan Tomkins.

== Career ==
From Princeton, Abelson went to Yale, where he stayed for the subsequent five decades of his career. Arriving during the Yale Communication Project, Abelson contributed to the foundation of attitudes studies as co-author of Attitude Organization and Change: An Analysis of Consistency Among Attitude Component, (1960, with Rosenberg, Hovland, McGuire, & Brehm). While at Yale, Abelson was briefly a bass in the Yale Russian Chorus. Abelson also played an instrumental role in the founding of computer science at Yale, chairing a 1967 University Committee that recommended establishing a computer science department.

With Milton J. Rosenberg, he developed the notion of “symbolic psycho-logic," an early attempt, using an idiosyncratic kind of adjacency matrix of a signed graph, at a descriptive (rather than prescriptive) psychological organization of attitudes and attitude consistency, which was key to the development of the field of social cognition.

The notion that beliefs, attitudes, and ideology were deeply connected knowledge structures was contained in Scripts, Plans, Goals, and Understanding (1977, with Roger Schank), a work that has collected several thousand citations, and led to the first interdisciplinary graduate program in cognitive science at Yale. His work on voting behavior in the 1960 and 1964 elections, and the creation of a computer program modeling ideology (the “Goldwater machine”) helped define and build the field of political psychology.

He was the author of Statistics As Principled Argument which includes prescriptions for how statistical analyses should proceed, as well as a description of what statistical analysis is, why we should do it, and how to differentiate good from bad statistical arguments. He was a co-author of several other books in psychology, statistics, and political science. In 1959, Abelson published a paper to elucidate different ways in which an individual tends to resolve his "belief dilemmas" (Abelson «Modes of Resolution of Belief Dilemmas» Journal of conflict Resolution 1959).

== Awards ==
Abelson received the Distinguished Scientific Contribution Award from APA, the Distinguished Scientist Award from SESP, and the Distinguished Scientist Award from the International Society of Political Psychology. He was elected a Fellow of the American Academy of Arts and Sciences in 1978.

== Death ==
He died of complications of Parkinson's disease.

== Books ==
- Bush, Robert R.; Abelson, Robert; Hyman, Ray (1956). Mathematics for Psychologists. New York: Social Science Research Council. OCLC 2301803.
- Schank, Roger; Abelson, Robert P. (1977). Scripts, plans, goals and understanding: An inquiry into human knowledge structures. New Jersey: Erlbaum. ISBN 0-470-99033-3.
- Abelson, Robert P. (1995). Statistics as Principled Argument. Hillsdale, N.J.: L. Erlbaum Associates. OCLC 31011850.
- Abelson, Robert P.; Frey, Kurt P.; Gregg, Aiden P. (2004). Experiments with People : Revelations From Social Psychology. Mahwah, N.J.: Lawrence Erlbaum. OCLC 51389089.

== See also ==
- The MAGIC criteria
- Abelson's paradox

== Bibliography ==
- Ira J. Roseman, Stephen J. Read, "Psychologist at Play: Robert P. Abelson's Life and Contributions to Psychological Science", Perspectives on Psychological Science 2:1:86–97 (March 2007) JSTOR 40212337
