= Biological plausibility =

Cause and effect relationship in medicine

In epidemiology and biomedicine, biological plausibility is the proposal of a causal association—a relationship between a putative cause and an outcome—that is consistent with existing biological and medical knowledge.

Biological plausibility is one component of a method of reasoning that can establish a cause-and-effect relationship between a biological factor and a particular disease or adverse event. It is also an important part of the process of evaluating whether a proposed therapy (drug, vaccine, surgical procedure, etc.) has a real benefit to a patient. This concept has application to many controversial public affairs debates, such as that over the causes of adverse vaccination outcomes.

Biological plausibility is an essential element of the intellectual background of epidemiology. The term originated in the seminal work of determining the causality of smoking-related disease (The Surgeon General's Advisory Committee on Smoking and Health [1964]).

== Applications ==
=== Disease and adverse event causality ===
It is generally agreed that to be considered "causal", the association between a biological factor and a disease (or other bad outcome) should be biologically coherent. That is to say, it should be plausible and explicable biologically according to the known facts of the natural history and biology of the disease in question.

Other important criteria in evaluations of disease and adverse event causality include consistency, strength of association, specificity and a meaningful temporal relationship. These are known collectively as the Bradford-Hill criteria, after the great English epidemiologist who proposed them in 1965. However, Austin Bradford Hill himself de-emphasized "plausibility" among the other criteria:

It will be helpful if the causation we suspect is biologically plausible. But this is a feature I am convinced we cannot demand. What is biologically plausible depends upon the biological knowledge of the day. To quote again from my Alfred Watson Memorial Lecture [1962], there was

"…no biological knowledge to support (or to refute) Pott's observation in the 18th century of the excess of cancer in chimney sweeps. It was lack of biological knowledge in the 19th that led to a prize essayist writing on the value and the fallacy of statistics to conclude, amongst other "absurd" associations, that 'it could be no more ridiculous for the strange who passed the night in the steerage of an emigrant ship to ascribe the typhus, which he there contracted, to the vermin with which bodies of the sick might be infected.' And coming to nearer times, in the 20th century there was no biological knowledge to support the evidence against rubella."

In short, the association we observe may be one new to science or medicine and we must not dismiss it too light-heartedly as just too odd. As Sherlock Holmes advised Dr. Watson, "when you have eliminated the impossible, whatever remains, however improbable, must be the truth."

=== Treatment outcomes ===
The preliminary research leading up to a randomized clinical trial (RCT) of a drug or biologic has been termed "plausibility building". This involves the gathering and analysis of biochemical, tissue or animal data which are eventually found to point to a mechanism of action or to demonstrate the desired biological effect. This process is said to confer biological plausibility. Since large, definitive RCTs are extremely expensive and labor-intensive, only sufficiently promising therapies are thought to merit the attention and effort of final confirmation (or refutation) in them.

In distinction to biological plausibility, clinical data from epidemiological studies, case reports, case series and small, formal open or controlled clinical trials may confer clinical plausibility. According to the strictest criteria, a therapy is sufficiently scientifically plausible to merit the time and expense of definitive testing only if it is either biologically or clinically plausible. It has been observed that, despite its importance, biological plausibility is lacking for most complementary and alternative medicine therapies.
