= Noncentral distribution =

Noncentral distributions are families of probability distributions that are related to other "central" families of distributions by means of a noncentrality parameter. Whereas the central distribution describes how a test statistic is distributed when the difference tested is null, noncentral distributions describe the distribution of a test statistic when the null is false (so the alternative hypothesis is true). This leads to their use in calculating statistical power.

If the noncentrality parameter of a distribution is zero, the distribution is identical to a distribution in the central family. For example, the Student's t-distribution is the central family of distributions for the noncentral t-distribution family.

Noncentrality parameters are used in the following distributions:

- Noncentral t-distribution
- Noncentral chi-squared distribution
- Noncentral chi-distribution
- Noncentral F-distribution
- Noncentral beta distribution

In general, noncentrality parameters occur in distributions that are transformations of a normal distribution. The "central" versions are derived from normal distributions that have a mean of zero; the noncentral versions generalize to arbitrary means. For example, the standard (central) chi-squared distribution is the distribution of a sum of squared independent standard normal distributions, i.e., normal distributions with mean 0, variance 1. The noncentral chi-squared distribution generalizes this to normal distributions with arbitrary mean and variance.

Each of these distributions has a single noncentrality parameter. However, there are extended versions of these distributions which have two noncentrality parameters: the doubly noncentral beta distribution, the doubly noncentral F distribution and the doubly noncentral t distribution. These types of distributions occur for distributions that are defined as the quotient of two independent distributions. When both source distributions are central (either with a zero mean or a zero noncentrality parameter, depending on the type of distribution), the result is a central distribution. When one is noncentral, a (singly) noncentral distribution results, while if both are noncentral, the result is a doubly noncentral distribution. As an example, a t-distribution is defined (ignoring constant values) as the quotient of a normal distribution and the square root of an independent chi-squared distribution. Extending this definition to encompass a normal distribution with arbitrary mean produces a noncentral t-distribution, while further extending it to allow a noncentral chi-squared distribution in the denominator while produces a doubly noncentral t-distribution.

There are some "noncentral distributions" that are not usually formulated in terms of a "noncentrality parameter": see noncentral hypergeometric distributions, for example.

The noncentrality parameter of the t-distribution may be negative or positive while the noncentral parameters of the other three distributions must be greater than zero.

== See also ==
- Confidence intervals by means of noncentrality parameters
