= MAGIC criteria =

Set of guidelines for using statistical analysis

The MAGIC criteria are a set of guidelines put forth by Robert Abelson in his 1995 book Statistics as Principled Argument. In this book he posits that the goal of statistical analysis should be to make compelling claims about the world and he presents the MAGIC criteria as a way to do that.

== What are the MAGIC criteria? ==
MAGIC is a backronym for:

1. Magnitude – How big is the effect? Large effects are more compelling than small ones.
2. Articulation – How specific is it? Precise statements are more compelling than imprecise ones.
3. Generality – How generally does it apply? More general effects are more compelling than less general ones. Claims that would interest a more general audience are more compelling.
4. Interestingness – interesting effects are those that "have the potential, through empirical analysis, to change what people believe about an important issue". More interesting effects are more compelling than less interesting ones. In addition, more surprising effects are more compelling than ones that merely confirm what is already known.
5. Credibility – Credible claims are more compelling than incredible ones. The researcher must show that the claims made are credible. Results that contradict previously established ones are less credible.

== Reviews and applications of the MAGIC criteria ==
Song Qian noted that the MAGIC criteria could be of use to ecologists. Claudia Stanny discussed them in a course on psychology. Anne Boomsma noted that they are useful when presenting results of complex statistical methods such as structural equation modelling.

== See also ==
- Bradford Hill criteria – Criteria for measuring cause and effect
