= Noncentral F-distribution =

Probability distribution generalizing the F-distribution with a noncentrality parameter

In probability theory and statistics, the noncentral F-distribution is a continuous probability distribution that is a noncentral generalization of the (ordinary) F-distribution. It describes the distribution of the quotient (X/n_{1})/(Y/n_{2}), where the numerator X has a noncentral chi-squared distribution with n_{1} degrees of freedom and the denominator Y has a central chi-squared distribution with n_{2} degrees of freedom. It is also required that X and Y are statistically independent of each other.

It is the distribution of the test statistic in analysis of variance problems when the null hypothesis is false. The noncentral F-distribution is used to find the power function of such a test.

== Occurrence and specification ==
If $X$ is a noncentral chi-squared random variable with noncentrality parameter $\lambda$ and $\nu_1$ degrees of freedom, and $Y$ is a chi-squared random variable with $\nu_2$ degrees of freedom that is statistically independent of $X$, then

$$F=\frac{X/\nu_1}{Y/\nu_2}$$

is a noncentral F-distributed random variable. The probability density function (pdf) for the noncentral F-distribution is

$$p(f)
=\sum\limits_{k=0}^\infty\frac{e^{-\lambda/2}(\lambda/2)^k}{ B\left(\frac{\nu_2}{2},\frac{\nu_1}{2}+k\right) k!}
\left(\frac{\nu_1}{\nu_2}\right)^{\frac{\nu_1}{2}+k}
\left(\frac{\nu_2}{\nu_2+\nu_1f}\right)^{\frac{\nu_1+\nu_2}{2}+k}f^{\nu_1/2-1+k}$$

when $f\ge0$ and zero otherwise. The degrees of freedom $\nu_1$ and $\nu_2$ are positive. The term $B(x,y)$ is the beta function, where

$$B(x,y)=\frac{\Gamma(x)\Gamma(y)}{\Gamma(x+y)}.$$

The cumulative distribution function for the noncentral F-distribution is

$$F(x\mid d_1,d_2,\lambda)=\sum\limits_{j=0}^\infty\left(\frac{\left(\frac{1}{2}\lambda\right)^j}{j!}e^{-\lambda/2} \right)I\left(\frac{d_1x}{d_2 + d_1x}\bigg|\frac{d_1}{2}+j,\frac{d_2}{2}\right)$$

where $I$ is the regularized incomplete beta function.

The mean and variance of the noncentral F-distribution are

$$\operatorname{E}[F] \quad
\begin{cases}
= \frac{\nu_2(\nu_1+\lambda)}{\nu_1(\nu_2-2)} & \text{if } \nu_2>2\\
\text{does not exist} & \text{if } \nu_2\le2\\
\end{cases}$$

and

$$\operatorname{Var}[F] \quad
\begin{cases}
= 2\frac{(\nu_1+\lambda)^2+(\nu_1+2\lambda)(\nu_2-2)}{(\nu_2-2)^2(\nu_2-4)}\left(\frac{\nu_2}{\nu_1}\right)^2
& \text{if } \nu_2>4\\
\text{does not exist}
& \text{if } \nu_2\le4.\\
\end{cases}$$

== Special cases ==
When λ = 0, the noncentral F-distribution becomes the F-distribution.

== Related distributions ==
Z has a noncentral chi-squared distribution if

$$Z=\lim_{\nu_2\to\infty}\nu_1 F$$

where F has a noncentral F-distribution.

See also noncentral t-distribution.

A Doubly noncentral F distribution has a noncentral chi-squared distribution in the numerator and denominator.

== Implementations ==
The noncentral F-distribution is implemented in the R language (e.g., pf function), in MATLAB (ncfcdf, ncfinv, ncfpdf, ncfrnd and ncfstat functions in the statistics toolbox) in Mathematica (NoncentralFRatioDistribution function), in NumPy (random.noncentral_f), and in Boost C++ Libraries.

A collaborative wiki page implements an interactive online calculator, programmed in the R language, for the noncentral t, chi-squared, and F distributions, at the Institute of Statistics and Econometrics of the Humboldt University of Berlin.
