= Log-concave =

Log-concave may refer to:

- Logarithmically concave function
- Logarithmically concave measure
- Logarithmically concave sequence
