= Marcum Q-function =

Function in statistics

In statistics, the generalized Marcum Q-function of order $\nu$ is defined as

$$Q_\nu (a,b) = \frac{1}{a^{\nu-1}} \int_b^\infty x^\nu \exp \left( -\frac{x^2 + a^2}{2} \right) I_{\nu-1}(ax) \, dx$$

where $b \geq 0$ and $a, \nu > 0$ and $I_{\nu-1}$ is the modified Bessel function of first kind of order $\nu-1$. If $b > 0$, the integral converges for any $\nu$. The Marcum Q-function occurs as a complementary cumulative distribution function for noncentral chi, noncentral chi-squared, and Rice distributions. In engineering, this function appears in the study of radar systems, communication systems, queueing system, and signal processing. This function was first studied for $\nu = 1$ by, and hence named after, Jess Marcum for pulsed radars.

== Properties ==
=== Finite integral representation ===
Using the fact that $Q_\nu (a,0) = 1$, the generalized Marcum Q-function can alternatively be defined as a finite integral as

$$Q_\nu (a,b) = 1 - \frac{1}{a^{\nu-1}} \int_0^b x^\nu \exp \left( -\frac{x^2 + a^2}{2} \right) I_{\nu-1}(ax) \, dx.$$

However, it is preferable to have an integral representation of the Marcum Q-function such that (i) the limits of the integral are independent of the arguments of the function, (ii) and that the limits are finite, (iii) and that the integrand is a Gaussian function of these arguments. For positive integer values of $\nu = n$, such a representation is given by the trigonometric integral

$$Q_n(a,b) = \left\{
\begin{array}{lr}
H_n(a,b) & a < b, \\
\frac{1}{2} + H_n(a,a) & a=b, \\
1 + H_n(a,b) & a > b,
\end{array}
\right.$$

where

$$H_n(a,b) = \frac{\zeta^{1-n}}{2\pi} \exp\left(-\frac{a^2+b^2}{2}\right) \int_0^{2\pi} \frac{\cos(n-1)\theta - \zeta \cos n\theta}{1-2\zeta\cos\theta + \zeta^2} \exp(ab\cos\theta) \mathrm{d} \theta,$$

and the ratio $\zeta = a/b$ is a constant.

For any real $\nu > 0$, such finite trigonometric integral is given by

$$Q_\nu(a,b) = \left\{
\begin{array}{lr}
H_\nu(a,b) + C_\nu(a,b) & a < b, \\
\frac{1}{2} + H_\nu(a,a) + C_\nu(a,b) & a=b, \\
1 + H_\nu(a,b) + C_\nu(a,b) & a > b,
\end{array}
\right.$$

where $H_n(a,b)$ is as defined before, $\zeta = a/b$, and the additional correction term is given by

$$C_\nu(a,b) = \frac{\sin(\nu\pi)}{\pi} \exp\left(-\frac{a^2+b^2}{2}\right) \int_0^1 \frac{(x/\zeta)^{\nu-1}}{\zeta+x} \exp\left[ -\frac{ab}{2}\left(x+\frac{1}{x}\right) \right] \mathrm{d}x.$$

For integer values of $\nu$, the correction term $C_\nu(a,b)$ tend to vanish.

=== Monotonicity and log-concavity ===
- The generalized Marcum Q-function $Q_\nu(a,b)$ is strictly increasing in $\nu$ and $a$ for all $a \geq 0$ and $b, \nu > 0$, and is strictly decreasing in $b$ for all $a, b \geq 0$ and $\nu>0.$
- The function $\nu \mapsto Q_\nu(a,b)$ is log-concave on $[1,\infty)$ for all $a , b \geq 0.$
- The function $b \mapsto Q_\nu(a,b)$ is strictly log-concave on $(0,\infty)$ for all $a \geq 0$ and $\nu > 1$, which implies that the generalized Marcum Q-function satisfies the new-is-better-than-used property.
- The function $a \mapsto 1 - Q_\nu(a,b)$ is log-concave on $[0,\infty)$ for all $b, \nu > 0.$

=== Series representation ===
- The generalized Marcum Q function of order $\nu > 0$ can be represented using incomplete Gamma function as

$$Q_\nu (a,b) = 1 - e^{-a^2/2} \sum_{k=0}^\infty \frac{1}{k!} \frac{\gamma(\nu+k,\frac{b^2}{2})}{\Gamma(\nu+k)} \left( \frac{a^2}{2} \right)^k,$$

where $\gamma(s,x)$ is the lower incomplete Gamma function. This is usually called the canonical representation of the $\nu$-th order generalized Marcum Q-function.

- The generalized Marcum Q function of order $\nu > 0$ can also be represented using generalized Laguerre polynomials as

$$Q_{\nu}(a,b) = 1 - e^{-a^2/2} \sum_{k=0}^\infty (-1)^k \frac{L_k^{(\nu-1)}(\frac{a^2}{2})}{\Gamma(\nu+k+1)} \left(\frac{b^2}{2}\right)^{k+\nu},$$

where $L_k^{(\alpha)}(\cdot)$ is the generalized Laguerre polynomial of degree $k$ and of order $\alpha$.

- The generalized Marcum Q-function of order $\nu > 0$ can also be represented as Neumann series expansions

$$Q_\nu (a,b) = e^{-(a^2 + b^2)/2} \sum_{\alpha=1-\nu}^\infty \left( \frac{a}{b}\right)^\alpha I_{-\alpha}(ab),$$

$$1 - Q_\nu(a,b) = e^{-(a^2 + b^2)/2} \sum_{\alpha=\nu}^\infty \left( \frac{b}{a}\right)^\alpha I_{\alpha}(ab),$$

where the summations are in increments of one. Note that when $\alpha$ assumes an integer value, we have $I_{\alpha}(ab) = I_{-\alpha}(ab)$.

- For non-negative half-integer values $\nu = n + 1/2$, we have a closed form expression for the generalized Marcum Q-function as

$$Q_{n+1/2}(a,b) = \frac{1}{2}\left[ \mathrm{erfc}\left(\frac{b-a}{\sqrt{2}}\right) + \mathrm{erfc}\left(\frac{b+a}{\sqrt{2}}\right) \right] + e^{-(a^2 + b^2)/2} \sum_{k=1}^n \left(\frac{b}{a}\right)^{k-1/2} I_{k-1/2}(ab),$$

where $\mathrm{erfc}(\cdot)$ is the complementary error function. Since Bessel functions with half-integer parameter have finite sum expansions as

$$I_{\pm(n+0.5)}(z) = \frac{1}{\sqrt{\pi}} \sum_{k=0}^n \frac{(n+k)!}{k!(n-k)!} \left[ \frac{(-1)^k e^z \mp (-1)^n e^{-z}}{(2z)^{k+0.5}} \right],$$

where $n$ is non-negative integer, we can exactly represent the generalized Marcum Q-function with half-integer parameter. More precisely, we have

$$Q_{n+1/2}(a,b) = Q(b-a) + Q(b+a) + \frac{1}{b\sqrt{2\pi}} \sum_{i=1}^{n} \left(\frac{b}{a}\right)^i \sum_{k=0}^{i-1} \frac{(i+k-1)!}{k!(i-k-1)!} \left[ \frac{(-1)^k e^{-(a-b)^2/2} + (-1)^i e^{-(a+b)^2/2}}{(2ab)^k} \right],$$

for non-negative integers $n$, where $Q(\cdot)$ is the Gaussian Q-function. Alternatively, we can also more compactly express the Bessel functions with half-integer as sum of hyperbolic sine and cosine functions:

$$I_{n+\frac{1}{2}}(z) =  \sqrt{\frac{2z}{\pi}} \left[ g_n(z) \sinh(z) + g_{-n-1}(z) \cosh(z)\right],$$

where $g_0(z) = z^{-1}$, $g_1(z) = -z^{-2}$, and $g_{n-1}(z) - g_{n+1}(z) = (2n+1) z^{-1} g_n(z)$ for any integer value of $n$.

=== Recurrence relation and generating function ===
- Integrating by parts, we can show that generalized Marcum Q-function satisfies the following recurrence relation

$$Q_{\nu+1}(a,b) - Q_\nu(a,b) = \left( \frac{b}{a} \right)^{\nu} e^{-(a^2 + b^2)/2} I_{\nu}(ab).$$

- The above formula is easily generalized as

$$Q_{\nu-n}(a,b) = Q_\nu(a,b) - \left(\frac{b}{a}\right)^\nu e^{-(a^2+b^2)/2}\sum_{k=1}^n \left(\frac{a}{b}\right)^k I_{\nu-k}(ab),$$

$$Q_{\nu+n}(a,b) = Q_\nu(a,b) + \left(\frac{b}{a}\right)^\nu e^{-(a^2+b^2)/2}\sum_{k=0}^{n-1} \left(\frac{b}{a}\right)^k I_{\nu+k}(ab),$$

for positive integer $n$. The former recurrence can be used to formally define the generalized Marcum Q-function for negative $\nu$. Taking $Q_\infty(a,b)=1$ and $Q_{-\infty}(a,b)=0$ for $n = \infty$, we obtain the Neumann series representation of the generalized Marcum Q-function.

- The related three-term recurrence relation is given by

$$Q_{\nu+1}(a,b) - (1+c_\nu(a,b))Q_\nu(a,b) + c_\nu(a,b) Q_{\nu-1}(a,b) = 0,$$

where

$$c_\nu(a,b) = \left(\frac{b}{a}\right) \frac{I_\nu(ab)}{I_{\nu+1}(ab)}.$$

We can eliminate the occurrence of the Bessel function to give the third order recurrence relation

$$\frac{a^2}{2} Q_{\nu+2}(a,b) = \left(\frac{a^2}{2} - \nu\right) Q_{\nu+1}(a,b) + \left(\frac{b^2}{2} + \nu\right)Q_{\nu}(a,b) - \frac{b^2}{2} Q_{\nu-1}(a,b).$$

- Another recurrence relationship, relating it with its derivatives, is given by

$$Q_{\nu+1}(a,b) = Q_\nu(a,b) + \frac{1}{a} \frac{\partial}{\partial a} Q_\nu(a,b),$$
$$Q_{\nu-1}(a,b) = Q_\nu(a,b) + \frac{1}{b} \frac{\partial}{\partial b} Q_\nu(a,b).$$

- The ordinary generating function of $Q_\nu(a,b)$ for integral $\nu$ is

$$\sum_{n=-\infty}^\infty t^n Q_n(a,b) = e^{-(a^2+b^2)/2} \frac{t}{1-t} e^{(b^2 t + a^2/t)/2},$$

where $|t|<1.$

=== Symmetry relation ===
- Using the two Neumann series representations, we can obtain the following symmetry relation for positive integral $\nu = n$

$$Q_n(a,b) + Q_n(b,a) = 1 + e^{-(a^2+b^2)/2} \left[ I_0(ab) + \sum_{k=1}^{n-1} \frac{a^{2k} + b^{2k}}{(ab)^k} I_k(ab) \right].$$

In particular, for $n = 1$ we have

$$Q_1(a,b) + Q_1(b,a) = 1 + e^{-(a^2+b^2)/2} I_0(ab).$$

=== Special values ===
Some specific values of Marcum-Q function are

- $Q_\nu(0,0) = 1,$
- $Q_\nu(a,0) = 1,$
- $Q_\nu(a,+\infty) = 0,$
- $Q_\nu(0,b) = \frac{\Gamma(\nu,b^2/2)}{\Gamma(\nu)},$
- $Q_\nu(+\infty,b) = 1,$
- $Q_\infty(a,b) = 1,$
- For $a=b$, by subtracting the two forms of Neumann series representations, we have

$$Q_1(a,a) = \frac{1}{2}[1 + e^{-a^2}I_0(a^2)],$$

which when combined with the recursive formula gives

$$Q_n(a,a) = \frac{1}{2}[1 + e^{-a^2}I_0(a^2)] + e^{-a^2} \sum_{k=1}^{n-1} I_k(a^2),$$
$$Q_{-n}(a,a) = \frac{1}{2}[1 + e^{-a^2}I_0(a^2)] - e^{-a^2} \sum_{k=1}^{n} I_k(a^2),$$

for any non-negative integer $n$.

- For $\nu = 1/2$, using the basic integral definition of generalized Marcum Q-function, we have

$$Q_{1/2}(a,b) = \frac{1}{2}\left[ \mathrm{erfc}\left(\frac{b-a}{\sqrt{2}}\right) + \mathrm{erfc}\left(\frac{b+a}{\sqrt{2}}\right) \right].$$

- For $\nu=3/2$, we have

$$Q_{3/2}(a,b) = Q_{1/2}(a,b) + \sqrt{\frac{2}{\pi}} \, \frac{\sinh(ab)}{a} e^{-(a^2 + b^2)/2}.$$

- For $\nu = 5/2$ we have

$$Q_{5/2}(a,b) = Q_{3/2}(a,b) + \sqrt{\frac{2}{\pi}} \, \frac{ab \cosh (ab) - \sinh (ab) }{a^3} e^{-(a^2 + b^2)/2}.$$

=== Asymptotic forms ===
- Assuming $\nu$ to be fixed and $ab$ large, let $\zeta = a/b > 0$, then the generalized Marcum-Q function has the following asymptotic form

$$Q_\nu(a,b) \sim  \sum_{n=0}^\infty \psi_n,$$

where $\psi_n$ is given by

$$\psi_n = \frac{1}{2\zeta^\nu \sqrt{2\pi}} (-1)^n \left[ A_n(\nu-1) - \zeta A_n(\nu) \right] \phi_n.$$

The functions $\phi_n$ and $A_n$ are given by

$$\phi_n = \left[ \frac{(b-a)^2}{2ab} \right]^{n-\frac{1}{2}} \Gamma\left(\frac{1}{2} - n, \frac{(b-a)^2}{2}\right),$$

$$A_n(\nu) = \frac{2^{-n}\Gamma(\frac{1}{2}+\nu+n)}{n!\Gamma(\frac{1}{2}+\nu-n)}.$$

The function $A_n(\nu)$ satisfies the recursion

$$A_{n+1}(\nu) = - \frac{(2n+1)^2 - 4\nu^2}{8(n+1)}A_n(\nu),$$

for $n \geq 0$ and $A_0(\nu)=1.$

- In the first term of the above asymptotic approximation, we have

$$\phi_0 = \frac{\sqrt{2 \pi ab}}{b-a} \mathrm{erfc}\left(\frac{b-a}{\sqrt{2}}\right).$$

Hence, assuming $b>a$, the first term asymptotic approximation of the generalized Marcum-Q function is

$$Q_\nu(a,b) \sim \psi_0 = \left(\frac{b}{a}\right)^{\nu-\frac{1}{2}} Q(b-a),$$

where $Q(\cdot)$ is the Gaussian Q-function. Here $Q_\nu(a,b) \sim 0.5$ as $a \uparrow b.$

For the case when $a > b$, we have

$$Q_\nu(a,b) \sim 1-\psi_0 = 1-\left(\frac{b}{a}\right)^{\nu-\frac{1}{2}} Q(a-b).$$

Here too $Q_\nu(a,b) \sim 0.5$ as $a \downarrow b.$

=== Differentiation ===
- The partial derivative of $Q_\nu(a,b)$ with respect to $a$ and $b$ is given by

$$\frac{\partial}{\partial a} Q_\nu(a,b) = a \left[Q_{\nu+1}(a,b) - Q_{\nu}(a,b)\right] = a \left(\frac{b}{a}\right)^{\nu} e^{-(a^2+b^2)/2} I_{\nu}(ab),$$
$$\frac{\partial}{\partial b} Q_\nu(a,b) = b \left[Q_{\nu-1}(a,b) - Q_{\nu}(a,b)\right] = - b \left(\frac{b}{a}\right)^{\nu-1} e^{-(a^2+b^2)/2} I_{\nu-1}(ab).$$

We can relate the two partial derivatives as

$$\frac{1}{a}\frac{\partial}{\partial a} Q_\nu(a,b) + \frac{1}{b} \frac{\partial}{\partial b} Q_{\nu+1}(a,b) = 0.$$

- The n-th partial derivative of $Q_\nu(a,b)$ with respect to its arguments is given by

$$\frac{\partial^n}{\partial a^n} Q_\nu(a,b) = n! (-a)^n \sum_{k=0}^{[n/2]} \frac{(-2a^2)^{-k}}{k!(n-2k)!} \sum_{p=0}^{n-k} (-1)^p \binom{n-k}{p} Q_{\nu+p}(a,b),$$
$$\frac{\partial^n}{\partial b^n} Q_\nu(a,b) = \frac{n! a^{1-\nu}}{2^n b^{n-\nu+1}} e^{-(a^2+b^2)/2} \sum_{k=[n/2]}^n \frac{(-2b^2)^k}{(n-k)!(2k-n)!} \sum_{p=0}^{k-1} \binom{k-1}{p} \left(-\frac{a}{b}\right)^p I_{\nu-p-1}(ab).$$

=== Inequalities ===
- The generalized Marcum-Q function satisfies a Turán-type inequality

$$Q^2_\nu(a,b) > \frac{Q_{\nu-1}(a,b) +  Q_{\nu+1}(a,b)}{2} > Q_{\nu-1}(a,b) Q_{\nu+1}(a,b)$$

for all $a \geq b > 0$ and $\nu > 1$.

== Bounds ==
=== Based on monotonicity and log-concavity ===
Various upper and lower bounds of generalized Marcum-Q function can be obtained using monotonicity and log-concavity of the function $\nu \mapsto Q_\nu(a,b)$ and the fact that we have closed form expression for $Q_\nu(a,b)$ when $\nu$ is half-integer valued.

Let $\lfloor x \rfloor_{0.5}$ and $\lceil x \rceil_{0.5}$ denote the pair of half-integer rounding operators that map a real $x$ to its nearest left and right half-odd integer, respectively, according to the relations

$$\lfloor x \rfloor_{0.5} = \lfloor x - 0.5 \rfloor + 0.5$$
$$\lceil x \rceil_{0.5} = \lceil x + 0.5 \rceil - 0.5$$

where $\lfloor x \rfloor$ and $\lceil x \rceil$ denote the integer floor and ceiling functions.

- The monotonicity of the function $\nu \mapsto Q_\nu(a,b)$ for all $a \geq 0$ and $b > 0$ gives us the following simple bound

$$Q_{\lfloor\nu\rfloor_{0.5}}(a,b) < Q_\nu(a,b) < Q_{\lceil\nu\rceil_{0.5}}(a,b).$$

However, the relative error of this bound does not tend to zero when $b \to \infty$. For integral values of $\nu = n$, this bound reduces to

$$Q_{n-0.5}(a,b) < Q_n(a,b) < Q_{n+0.5}(a,b).$$

A very good approximation of the generalized Marcum Q-function for integer valued $\nu = n$ is obtained by taking the arithmetic mean of the upper and lower bound

$$Q_n(a,b) \approx \frac{Q_{n-0.5}(a,b) + Q_{n+0.5}(a,b)}{2}.$$

- A tighter bound can be obtained by exploiting the log-concavity of $\nu \mapsto Q_\nu(a,b)$ on $[1,\infty)$ as

$$Q_{\nu_1}(a,b)^{\nu_2 - v} Q_{\nu_2}(a,b)^{v - \nu_1} < Q_\nu(a,b) < \frac{Q_{\nu_2}(a,b)^{\nu_2 - \nu + 1}}{Q_{\nu_2 + 1}(a,b)^{\nu_2 - \nu}},$$

where $\nu_1 = \lfloor\nu\rfloor_{0.5}$ and $\nu_2 = \lceil\nu\rceil_{0.5}$ for $\nu \geq 1.5$. The tightness of this bound improves as either $a$ or $\nu$ increases. The relative error of this bound converges to 0 as $b \to \infty$. For integral values of $\nu = n$, this bound reduces to

$$\sqrt{Q_{n - 0.5}(a,b) Q_{n + 0.5}(a,b)} < Q_n(a,b) < Q_{n + 0.5}(a,b) \sqrt{\frac{Q_{n + 0.5}(a,b)}{Q_{n + 1.5}(a,b)}}.$$

=== Cauchy-Schwarz bound ===
Using the trigonometric integral representation for integer valued $\nu=n$, the following Cauchy-Schwarz bound can be obtained

$$e^{-b^2/2} \leq Q_n(a,b) \leq \exp\left[-\frac{1}{2}(b^2 + a^2)\right] \sqrt{I_0(2ab)} \sqrt{\frac{2n-1}{2} + \frac{\zeta^{2(1-n)}}{2(1-\zeta^2)}}, \qquad \zeta < 1,$$
$$1 - Q_n(a,b) \leq \exp\left[-\frac{1}{2}(b^2+a^2)\right] \sqrt{I_0(2ab)} \sqrt{\frac{\zeta^{2(1-n)}}{2(\zeta^2-1)}}, \qquad \zeta > 1,$$

where $\zeta = a/b >0$.

=== Exponential-type bounds ===
For analytical purpose, it is often useful to have bounds in simple exponential form, even though they may not be the tightest bounds achievable. Letting $\zeta = a/b >0$, one such bound for integer valued $\nu = n$ is given as

$$e^{-(b+a)^2/2} \leq Q_n(a,b) \leq e^{-(b-a)^2/2} + \frac{\zeta^{1-n} - 1}{\pi(1-\zeta)} \left[e^{-(b-a)^2/2} - e^{-(b+a)^2/2} \right], \qquad \zeta < 1,$$
$$Q_n(a,b) \geq 1 - \frac{1}{2}\left[e^{-(a-b)^2/2} - e^{-(a+b)^2/2} \right], \qquad \zeta > 1.$$

When $n=1$, the bound simplifies to give

$$e^{-(b+a)^2/2} \leq Q_1(a,b) \leq e^{-(b-a)^2/2}, \qquad \zeta <1,$$
$$1 - \frac{1}{2}\left[e^{-(a-b)^2/2} - e^{-(a+b)^2/2} \right] \leq Q_1(a,b), \qquad \zeta > 1.$$

Another such bound obtained via Cauchy-Schwarz inequality is given as

$$e^{-b^2/2} \leq Q_n(a,b) \leq \frac{1}{2} \sqrt{\frac{2n-1}{2} + \frac{\zeta^{2(1-n)}}{2(1-\zeta^2)}} \left[ e^{-(b-a)^2/2} + e^{-(b+a)^2/2} \right], \qquad \zeta < 1$$
$$Q_n(a,b) \geq 1 - \frac{1}{2} \sqrt{\frac{\zeta^{2(1-n)}}{2(\zeta^2-1)}} \left[ e^{-(b-a)^2/2} + e^{-(b+a)^2/2} \right], \qquad \zeta > 1.$$

=== Chernoff-type bound ===
Chernoff-type bounds for the generalized Marcum Q-function, where $\nu = n$ is an integer, is given by

$$(1-2\lambda)^{-n} \exp \left(-\lambda b^2 + \frac{\lambda n a^2}{1 - 2\lambda} \right) \geq \left\{
\begin{array}{lr}
Q_n(a,b), & b^2 > n(a^2+2) \\
1 - Q_n(a,b), & b^2 < n(a^2+2)
\end{array}
\right.$$

where the Chernoff parameter $(0 < \lambda < 1/2)$ has optimum value $\lambda_0$ of

$$\lambda_0 = \frac{1}{2}\left(1 - \frac{n}{b^2} - \frac{n}{b^2} \sqrt{1 + \frac{(ab)^2}{n}}\right).$$

=== Semi-linear approximation ===
The first-order Marcum-Q function can be semi-linearly approximated by

$$\begin{align}
Q_1(a, b)=
\begin{cases}
1, ~~~~~~~~~~~~~~~~~~~~~~~~~~~~~~~~~~~~~~~~~~~~~~~~~~~~~~~~~~~~~~~~~~~~~~~~~~~~~~~~~~~\mathrm{if}~ b < c_1  \\
-\beta_0 e^{-\frac{1}{2}\left(a^2+\left(\beta_0\right)^2\right)}I_0\left(a\beta_0\right)\left(b-\beta_0\right)+Q_1\left(a,\beta_0\right),  ~~~~~\mathrm{if}~ c_1 \leq b \leq c_2 \\
0,  ~~~~~~~~~~~~~~~~~~~~~~~~~~~~~~~~~~~~~~~~~~~~~~~~~~~~~~~~~~~~~~~~~~~~~~~~~~~~~~~~~~~\mathrm{if}~ b> c_2
\end{cases}
\end{align}$$

where

$$\begin{align}
\beta_0 =  \frac{a+\sqrt{a^2+2}}{2},
\end{align}$$
$$\begin{align}
c_1(a) = \max\Bigg(0,\beta_0+\frac{Q_1\left(a,\beta_0\right)-1}{\beta_0 e^{-\frac{1}{2}\left(a^2+\left(\beta_0\right)^2\right)}I_0\left(a\beta_0\right)}\Bigg),
\end{align}$$

and

$$\begin{align}
c_2(a) = \beta_0+\frac{Q_1\left(a,\beta_0\right)}{\beta_0 e^{-\frac{1}{2}\left(a^2+\left(\beta_0\right)^2\right)}I_0\left(a\beta_0\right)}.
\end{align}$$

== Equivalent forms for efficient computation ==
It is convenient to re-express the Marcum Q-function as

$$P_N(X,Y) = Q_N(\sqrt{2NX},\sqrt{2Y}).$$

The $P_N(X,Y)$ can be interpreted as the detection probability of $N$ incoherently integrated received signal samples of constant received signal-to-noise ratio, $X$, with a normalized detection threshold $Y$. In this equivalent form of Marcum Q-function, for given $a$ and $b$, we have $X = a^2/2N$ and $Y = b^2/2$. Many expressions exist that can represent $P_N(X,Y)$. However, the five most reliable, accurate, and efficient ones for numerical computation are given below. They are form one:

$$P_N(X,Y) = \sum_{k=0}^\infty e^{-NX} \frac{(NX)^k}{k!} \sum_{m=0}^{N-1+k} e^{-Y} \frac{Y^m}{m!},$$

form two:

$$P_N(X,Y) = \sum_{m=0}^{N-1} e^{-Y} \frac{Y^m}{m!} + \sum_{m=N}^\infty e^{-Y} \frac{Y^m}{m!} \left( 1 - \sum_{k=0}^{m-N} e^{-NX} \frac{(NX)^k}{k!} \right),$$

form three:

$$1 - P_N(X,Y) = \sum_{m=N}^\infty e^{-Y} \frac{Y^m}{m!} \sum_{k=0}^{m-N} e^{-NX} \frac{(NX)^k}{k!},$$

form four:

$$1 - P_N(X,Y) = \sum_{k=0}^\infty e^{-NX} \frac{(NX)^k}{k!} \left( 1 - \sum_{m=0}^{N-1+k} e^{-Y} \frac{Y^m}{m!} \right),$$

and form five:

$$1 - P_N(X,Y) = e^{-(NX+Y)} \sum_{r=N}^\infty \left(\frac{Y}{NX}\right)^{r/2} I_r(2\sqrt{NXY}).$$

Among these five form, the second form is the most robust.

== Applications ==
The generalized Marcum Q-function can be used to represent the cumulative distribution function (cdf) of many random variables:

- If $X \sim \mathrm{Exp}(\lambda)$ is an exponential distribution with rate parameter $\lambda$, then its cdf is given by $F_X(x) = 1 - Q_1\left(0,\sqrt{2 \lambda x}\right)$
- If $X \sim \mathrm{Erlang}(k,\lambda)$ is a Erlang distribution with shape parameter $k$ and rate parameter $\lambda$, then its cdf is given by $F_X(x) = 1 - Q_k\left(0,\sqrt{2 \lambda x}\right)$
- If $X \sim \chi^2_k$ is a chi-squared distribution with $k$ degrees of freedom, then its cdf is given by $F_X(x) = 1 - Q_{k/2}(0,\sqrt{x})$
- If $X \sim \mathrm{Gamma}(\alpha,\beta)$ is a gamma distribution with shape parameter $\alpha$ and rate parameter $\beta$, then its cdf is given by $F_X(x) = 1 - Q_{\alpha}(0,\sqrt{2 \beta x})$
- If $X \sim \mathrm{Weibull}(k,\lambda)$ is a Weibull distribution with shape parameters $k$ and scale parameter $\lambda$, then its cdf is given by $F_X(x) = 1 - Q_1 \left( 0, \sqrt{2} \left(\frac{x}{\lambda}\right)^{\frac{k}{2}} \right)$
- If $X \sim \mathrm{GG}(a,d,p)$ is a generalized gamma distribution with parameters $a, d, p$, then its cdf is given by $F_X(x) = 1 - Q_{\frac{d}{p}} \left( 0, \sqrt{2} \left(\frac{x}{a}\right)^{\frac{p}{2}} \right)$
- If $X \sim \chi^2_k(\lambda)$ is a non-central chi-squared distribution with non-centrality parameter $\lambda$ and $k$ degrees of freedom, then its cdf is given by $F_X(x) = 1 - Q_{k/2}(\sqrt{\lambda},\sqrt{x})$
- If $X \sim \mathrm{Rayleigh}(\sigma)$ is a Rayleigh distribution with parameter $\sigma$, then its cdf is given by $F_X(x) = 1 - Q_1\left(0,\frac{x}{\sigma}\right)$
- If $X \sim \mathrm{Maxwell}(\sigma)$ is a Maxwell–Boltzmann distribution with parameter $\sigma$, then its cdf is given by $F_X(x) = 1 - Q_{3/2}\left(0,\frac{x}{\sigma}\right)$
- If $X \sim \chi_k$ is a chi distribution with $k$ degrees of freedom, then its cdf is given by $F_X(x) = 1 - Q_{k/2}(0,x)$
- If $X \sim \mathrm{Nakagami}(m,\Omega)$ is a Nakagami distribution with $m$ as shape parameter and $\Omega$ as spread parameter, then its cdf is given by $F_X(x) = 1 - Q_{m}\left(0,\sqrt{\frac{2m}{\Omega}}x\right)$
- If $X \sim \mathrm{Rice}(\nu,\sigma)$ is a Rice distribution with parameters $\nu$ and $\sigma$, then its cdf is given by $F_X(x) = 1 - Q_1\left(\frac{\nu}{\sigma},\frac{x}{\sigma}\right)$
- If $X \sim \chi_k(\lambda)$ is a non-central chi distribution with non-centrality parameter $\lambda$ and $k$ degrees of freedom, then its cdf is given by $F_X(x) = 1 - Q_{k/2}(\lambda,x)$
