= Zero degrees of freedom =

In statistics, the non-central chi-squared distribution with zero degrees of freedom can be used in testing the null hypothesis that a sample is from a uniform distribution on the interval (0, 1). This distribution was introduced by Andrew F. Siegel in 1979.

The chi-squared distribution with n degrees of freedom is the probability distribution of the sum

$$X_1^2+\cdots+X_n^2 \,$$

where

$$X_1,\ldots,X_n \sim \operatorname{i.i.d. N}(0,1). \,$$

However, if

$$X_k \sim \operatorname{N} (\mu_k,1)$$

and $X_1,\ldots,X_n$ are independent, then the sum of squares above has a non-central chi-squared distribution with n degrees of freedom and "noncentrality parameter"

$$\mu_1^2 + \cdots + \mu_n^2. \,$$

It is trivial that a "central" chi-square distribution with zero degrees of freedom concentrates all probability at zero.

All of this leaves open the question of what happens with zero degrees of freedom when the noncentrality parameter is not zero.

The noncentral chi-squared distribution with zero degrees of freedom and with noncentrality parameter μ is the distribution of

$$\begin{align}
& \sum_{k\,=\,1}^{2K} X_k^2 \\
\text{where } & K\sim\operatorname{Poisson}(\mu/2) \\
\text{and } & X_1,X_2,X_3,\ldots\sim\operatorname{i.i.d. N}(0,1).
\end{align}$$

This concentrates probability e^{−μ/2} at zero; thus it is a mixture of discrete and continuous distributions
