= Convex measure =

In measure and probability theory in mathematics, a convex measure is a probability measure that — loosely put — does not assign more mass to any intermediate set "between" two measurable sets A and B than it does to A or B individually. There are multiple ways in which the comparison between the probabilities of A and B and the intermediate set can be made, leading to multiple definitions of convexity, such as log-concavity, harmonic convexity, and so on. The mathematician Christer Borell was a pioneer of the detailed study of convex measures on locally convex spaces in the 1970s.

== General definition and special cases ==
Let X be a locally convex Hausdorff vector space, and consider a probability measure μ on the Borel σ-algebra of X. Fix −∞ ≤ s ≤ 0, and define, for u, v ≥ 0 and 0 ≤ λ ≤ 1,

$$M_{s, \lambda}(u, v) = \begin{cases} (\lambda u^s + (1 - \lambda) v^{s})^{1/s} & \text{if } - \infty < s < 0, \\ \min(u, v) & \text{if } s = - \infty, \\ u^{\lambda} v^{1- \lambda} & \text{if } s = 0. \end{cases}$$

For subsets A and B of X, we write

$$\lambda A + (1 - \lambda) B = \{ \lambda x + ( 1 - \lambda ) y \mid x \in A, y \in B \}$$

for their Minkowski sum. With this notation, the measure μ is said to be s-convex if, for all Borel-measurable subsets A and B of X and all 0 ≤ λ ≤ 1,

$$\mu(\lambda A + (1 - \lambda) B) \geq M_{s, \lambda}(\mu(A), \mu(B)).$$

The special case s = 0 is the inequality

$$\mu(\lambda A + (1 - \lambda) B) \geq \mu(A)^{\lambda} \mu(B)^{1 - \lambda},$$

i.e.

$$\log \mu(\lambda A + (1 - \lambda) B) \geq \lambda \log \mu(A) + (1 - \lambda) \log \mu(B).$$

Thus, a measure being 0-convex is the same thing as it being a logarithmically concave measure.

== Properties ==
The classes of s-convex measures form a nested increasing family as s decreases to −∞"

$$s \leq t \text{ and } \mu \text{ is } t \text{-convex} \implies  \mu \text{ is } s \text{-convex}$$

or, equivalently

$$s \leq t \implies \{ s \text{-convex measures} \} \supseteq  \{ t \text{-convex measures} \}.$$

Thus, the collection of −∞-convex measures is the largest such class, whereas the 0-convex measures (the logarithmically concave measures) are the smallest class.

The convexity of a measure μ on n-dimensional Euclidean space R^{n} in the sense above is closely related to the convexity of its probability density function. Indeed, μ is s-convex if and only if there is an absolutely continuous measure ν with probability density function ρ on some R^{k} so that μ is the push-forward on ν under a linear or affine map and $e_{s, k} \circ \rho \colon \mathbb{R}^{k} \to \mathbb{R}$ is a convex function, where

$$e_{s, k}(t) = \begin{cases} t^{s / (1 - s k)} & \text{if } -\infty < s < 0 \\ t^{-1/k} & \text{if } s = - \infty, \\ - \log t & \text{if } s = 0.\end{cases}$$

Convex measures also satisfy a zero-one law: if G is a measurable additive subgroup of the vector space X (i.e. a measurable linear subspace), then the inner measure of G under μ,

$$\mu_{\ast}(G) = \sup \{ \mu(K) \mid K \subseteq G \text{ and } K \text{ is compact} \},$$

must be 0 or 1. (In the case that μ is a Radon measure, and hence inner regular, the measure μ and its inner measure coincide, so the μ-measure of G is then 0 or 1.)
