= Proofs related to chi-squared distribution =

The following are proofs of several characteristics related to the chi-squared distribution.

== Derivations of the pdf ==
=== Derivation of the pdf for one degree of freedom ===
Let random variable Y be defined as Y = X^{2} where X has normal distribution with mean 0 and variance 1 (that is X ~ N(0,1)).

Then,
$$\begin{alignat}{2}
\text{for} ~ y < 0, & ~~ F_Y(y) = P(Y<y) = 0 ~~ \text{and} \\
\text{for} ~ y \geq 0, & ~~ F_Y(y) = P(Y<y) = P(X^2<y) = P(|X|<\sqrt{y}) = P(-\sqrt{y} < X <\sqrt{y})\\
~~ & = F_X(\sqrt{y})-F_X(-\sqrt{y})= F_X(\sqrt{y})-(1-F_X(\sqrt{y}))= 2 F_X(\sqrt{y})-1
\end{alignat}$$

$$\begin{align}
f_Y(y) &= \tfrac{d}{dy} F_Y(y) = 2 \tfrac{d}{dy} F_X(\sqrt{y}) - 0 = 2 \frac{d}{dy} \left( \int_{-\infty}^\sqrt{y} \frac{1}{\sqrt{2\pi}} e^{\frac{-t^2}{2}} dt \right) \\
& = 2 \frac{1}{\sqrt{2 \pi}} e^{-\frac{y}{2}} (\sqrt{y})'_y = 2 \frac{1}{\sqrt{2}\sqrt{\pi}} e^{-\frac{y}{2}} \left( \frac{1}{2} y^{-\frac{1}{2}} \right) \\
& = \frac{1}{2^{\frac{1}{2}} \Gamma(\frac{1}{2})}y^{-\frac{1}{2}}e^{-\frac{y}{2}}
\end{align}$$

Where $F$ and $f$ are the cdf and pdf of the corresponding random variables.

Then $Y = X^2 \sim \chi^2_1.$

==== Alternative proof directly using the change of variable formula ====
The change of variable formula (implicitly derived above), for a monotonic transformation $y=g(x)$, is:

$$f_Y(y) = \sum_{i} f_X(g_{i}^{-1}(y)) \left| \frac{d g_{i}^{-1}(y)}{d y} \right|.$$

In this case the change is not monotonic, because every value of $\scriptstyle Y$ has two corresponding values of $\scriptstyle X$ (one positive and negative). However, because of symmetry, both halves will transform identically, i.e.

$$f_Y(y) = 2f_X(g^{-1}(y)) \left| \frac{d g^{-1}(y)}{d y} \right|.$$

In this case, the transformation is: $x = g^{-1}(y) = \sqrt{y}$, and its derivative is $\frac{d g^{-1}(y)}{d y} = \frac{1}{2\sqrt{y}} .$

So here:

$$f_Y(y) = 2\frac{1}{\sqrt{2\pi}}e^{-y/2} \frac{1}{2\sqrt{y}} = \frac{1}{\sqrt{2\pi y}}e^{-y/2}.$$

And one gets the chi-squared distribution, noting the property of the gamma function: $\Gamma(1/2)=\sqrt{\pi}$.

=== Derivation of the pdf for two degrees of freedom ===
There are several methods to derive chi-squared distribution with 2 degrees of freedom. Here is one based on the distribution with 1 degree of freedom.

Suppose that $X$ and $Y$ are two independent variables satisfying $X\sim\chi^2_1$ and $Y\sim\chi^2_1$, so that the probability density functions of $X$ and $Y$ are respectively:

$$f_X(x)=\frac{1}{2^{\frac{1}{2}}\Gamma(\frac{1}{2})}x^{-\frac{1}{2}}e^{-\frac{x}{2}}$$

and of course $f_Y(y) = f_X(y)$. Then, we can derive the joint distribution of $(X,Y)$:

$$f(x,y)=f_X(x)\,f_Y(y) = \frac{1}{2\pi}(xy)^{-\frac{1}{2}}e^{-\frac{x+y}{2}}$$

where $\Gamma(\tfrac{1}{2})^2 = \pi$. Further, let $A=xy$ and $B=x+y$, we can get that:

$$x = \frac{B+\sqrt{B^2-4A}}{2}$$

and

$$y = \frac{B-\sqrt{B^2-4A}}{2}$$

or, inversely

$$x = \frac{B-\sqrt{B^2-4A}}{2}$$

and

$$y = \frac{B+\sqrt{B^2-4A}}{2}$$

Since the two variable change policies are symmetric, we take the upper one and multiply the result by 2. The Jacobian determinant can be calculated as:

$$\operatorname{Jacobian}\left( \frac{x, y}{A, B} \right)
=\begin{vmatrix}
-(B^2-4A)^{-\frac{1}{2}}                     & \frac{1+B(B^2-4A)^{-\frac{1}{2}}}{2}             \\
(B^2-4A)^{-\frac{1}{2}}                     & \frac{1-B(B^2-4A)^{-\frac{1}{2}}}{2}             \\
\end{vmatrix}
=-(B^2-4A)^{-\frac{1}{2}}$$

Now we can change $f(x,y)$ to $f(A,B)$:

$$f(A,B)=2\times\frac{1}{2\pi}A^{-\frac{1}{2}}e^{-\frac{B}{2}}(B^2-4A)^{-\frac{1}{2}}$$

where the leading constant 2 is to take both the two variable change policies into account. Finally, we integrate out $A$ to get the distribution of $B$, i.e. $x+y$:

$$f(B)=2\times\frac{e^{-\frac{B}{2}}}{2\pi}\int_0^{\frac{B^2}{4}}A^{-\frac{1}{2}}(B^2-4A)^{-\frac{1}{2}}dA$$

Substituting $A=\frac{B^2}{4}\sin^2(t)$ gives:

$$f(B)=2\times\frac{e^{-\frac{B}{2}}}{2\pi}\int_0^{\frac{\pi}{2}} \, dt$$

So, the result is:

$$f(B)=\frac{e^{-\frac{B}{2}}}{2}$$

=== Derivation of the pdf for k degrees of freedom ===
Consider the k samples $x_i$ to represent a single point in a k-dimensional space. The chi square distribution for k degrees of freedom will then be given by:

$$P(Q) \, dQ = \int_\mathcal{V} \prod_{i=1}^k (N(x_i)\,dx_i) = \int_\mathcal{V} \frac{e^{-(x_1^2 + x_2^2 + \cdots +x_k^2)/2}}{(2\pi)^{k/2}}\,dx_1\,dx_2 \cdots dx_k$$

where $N(x)$ is the standard normal distribution and $\mathcal{V}$ is that elemental shell volume at Q(x), which is proportional to the (k − 1)-dimensional surface in k-space for which

$$Q=\sum_{i=1}^k x_i^2$$

It can be seen that this surface is the surface of a k-dimensional ball or, alternatively, an n-sphere where n = k - 1 with radius $R=\sqrt{Q}$, and that the term in the exponent is simply expressed in terms of Q. Since it is a constant, it may be removed from inside the integral.

$$P(Q) \, dQ = \frac{e^{-Q/2}}{(2\pi)^{k/2}} \int_\mathcal{V} dx_1\,dx_2\cdots dx_k$$

The integral is now simply the surface area A of the (k − 1)-sphere times the infinitesimal thickness of the sphere which is

$$dR=\frac{dQ}{2Q^{1/2}}.$$

The area of a (k − 1)-sphere is:

$$A=\frac{2R^{k-1}\pi^{k/2}}{\Gamma(k/2)}$$

Substituting, realizing that $\Gamma(z+1)=z\Gamma(z)$, and cancelling terms yields:

$$P(Q) \, dQ = \frac{e^{-Q/2}}{(2\pi)^{k/2}}A\,dR= \frac{1}{2^{k/2}\Gamma(k/2)}Q^{k/2-1}e^{-Q/2}\,dQ$$
