= Logarithmically concave sequence =

Type of sequence of numbers

The rows of Pascal's triangle are examples for logarithmically concave sequences.

In mathematics, a sequence a = (a_{0}, a_{1}, ..., a_{n}) of nonnegative real numbers is called a logarithmically concave sequence, or a log-concave sequence for short, if a_{i}^{2} ≥ a_{i−1}a_{i+1} holds for 0 < i < n .

Remark: some authors (explicitly or not) add two further conditions in the definition of log-concave sequences:

- a is non-negative
- a has no internal zeros; in other words, the support of a is an interval of Z.

These conditions mirror the ones required for log-concave functions.

Sequences that fulfill the three conditions are also called Pólya Frequency sequences of order 2 (PF_{2} sequences). Refer to chapter 2 of for a discussion on the two notions. For instance, the sequence (1,1,0,0,1) satisfies the concavity inequalities but not the internal zeros condition.

Examples of log-concave sequences are given by the binomial coefficients along any row of Pascal's triangle and the elementary symmetric means of a finite sequence of real numbers.

== See also ==
- Unimodality
- Logarithmically concave function
- Logarithmically concave measure
