= Logarithmically concave function =

Type of mathematical function

In convex analysis, a non-negative function f: R^{n} → R_{+} is logarithmically concave (or log-concave for short) if its domain is a convex set, and if it satisfies the inequality

$$f(\theta x + (1 - \theta) y) \geq f(x)^{\theta} f(y)^{1 - \theta}$$

for all x, y ∈ dom f and 0 < θ < 1. If f is strictly positive, this is equivalent to saying that the logarithm of the function, log ∘ f, is concave; that is,

$$\log  f(\theta x + (1 - \theta) y) \geq \theta \log f(x) + (1-\theta) \log f(y)$$

for all x, y ∈ dom f and 0 < θ < 1.

Examples of log-concave functions are the 0-1 indicator functions of convex sets (which requires the more flexible definition), and the Gaussian function.

Similarly, a function is log-convex if it satisfies the reverse inequality

$$f(\theta x + (1 - \theta) y) \leq f(x)^{\theta} f(y)^{1 - \theta}$$

for all x, y ∈ dom f and 0 < θ < 1.

For non-negative discrete functions f: Z → R_{+}, it is log-concave if

$$f(k)^2 \geq f(k+1)f(k-1)$$

== Properties ==
- A log-concave function is also quasi-concave. This follows from the fact that the logarithm is monotone implying that the superlevel sets of this function are convex.
- Every concave function that is nonnegative on its domain is log-concave. However, the reverse does not necessarily hold. An example is the Gaussian function f(x) = exp(−x^{2}/2) which is log-concave since log f(x) = −x^{2}/2 is a concave function of x. But f is not concave since the second derivative is positive for |x| > 1:

$$f''(x)=e^{-\frac{x^2}{2}} (x^2-1) \nleq 0$$

- From above two points, concavity $\Rightarrow$ log-concavity $\Rightarrow$ quasiconcavity.
- A twice differentiable, nonnegative function with a convex domain is log-concave if and only if for all x satisfying f(x) > 0,

$f(x)\nabla^2f(x) \preceq \nabla f(x)\nabla f(x)^T$,

i.e.

$f(x)\nabla^2f(x) - \nabla f(x)\nabla f(x)^T$ is

negative semi-definite. For functions of one variable, this condition simplifies to

$$f(x)f''(x) \leq (f'(x))^2$$

== Operations preserving log-concavity ==
- Products: The product of log-concave functions is also log-concave. Indeed, if f and g are log-concave functions, then log f and log g are concave by definition. Therefore

$$\log\,f(x) + \log\,g(x) = \log(f(x)g(x))$$

is concave, and hence also f g is log-concave.

- Marginals: if f(x, y): R^{n+m} → R is log-concave, then

$$g(x)=\int f(x,y) dy$$

is log-concave (see Prékopa–Leindler inequality).

- This implies that convolution preserves log-concavity, since h(x, y) = f(x − y) g(y) is log-concave if f and g are log-concave, and therefore

$$(f*g)(x)=\int f(x-y)g(y) dy = \int h(x,y) dy$$

is log-concave.

== Log-concave distributions ==
Log-concave distributions are necessary for a number of algorithms, e.g. adaptive rejection sampling. Every distribution with log-concave density is a maximum entropy probability distribution with specified mean μ and Deviation risk measure D. As it happens, many common probability distributions are log-concave. Some examples:

- the normal distribution and multivariate normal distributions,
- the exponential distribution,
- the uniform distribution over any convex set,
- the binomial distribution,
- the logistic distribution,
- the extreme value distribution,
- the Laplace distribution,
- the chi distribution,
- the hyperbolic secant distribution,
- the Wishart distribution, if n ≥ p + 1,
- the Dirichlet distribution, if all parameters are ≥ 1,
- the gamma distribution if the shape parameter is ≥ 1,
- the chi-square distribution if the number of degrees of freedom is ≥ 2,
- the beta distribution if both shape parameters are ≥ 1, and
- the Weibull distribution if the shape parameter is ≥ 1.

Note that all of the parameter restrictions have the same basic source: The exponent of non-negative quantity must be non-negative in order for the function to be log-concave.

The following distributions are non-log-concave for all parameters:

- the Student's t-distribution,
- the Cauchy distribution,
- the Pareto distribution,
- the log-normal distribution, and
- the F-distribution.

Note that the cumulative distribution function (CDF) of all log-concave distributions is also log-concave. However, some non-log-concave distributions also have log-concave CDF's:

- the log-normal distribution,
- the Pareto distribution,
- the Weibull distribution when the shape parameter < 1, and
- the gamma distribution when the shape parameter < 1.

The following are among the properties of log-concave distributions:

- If a density is log-concave, so is its cumulative distribution function (CDF).
- If a multivariate density is log-concave, so is the marginal density over any subset of variables.
- The sum of two independent log-concave random variables is log-concave. This follows from the fact that the convolution of two log-concave functions is log-concave.
- The product of two log-concave functions is log-concave. This means that joint densities formed by multiplying two probability densities (e.g. the normal-gamma distribution, which always has a shape parameter ≥ 1) will be log-concave. This property is heavily used in general-purpose Gibbs sampling programs such as BUGS and JAGS, which are thereby able to use adaptive rejection sampling over a wide variety of conditional distributions derived from the product of other distributions.
- If a density is log-concave, so is its survival function.
- If a density is log-concave, it has a monotone hazard rate (MHR), and is a regular distribution since the derivative of the logarithm of the survival function is the negative hazard rate, and by concavity is monotone i.e.

$\frac{d}{dx}\log\left(1-F(x)\right) = -\frac{f(x)}{1-F(x)}$ which is decreasing as it is the derivative of a concave function.

== See also ==
- logarithmically concave sequence
- logarithmically concave measure
- logarithmically convex function
- convex function
