= Noncentral chi distribution =

Noncentral chi
- Parameters: $k > 0\,$ degrees of freedom $\lambda > 0\,$
- Support: $x \in [0; +\infty)\,$
- PDF: $\frac{e^{-(x^2+\lambda^2)/2}x^k\lambda} {(\lambda x)^{k/2}} I_{k/2-1}(\lambda x)$
- CDF: $1 - Q_{\frac{k}{2}} \left( \lambda, x \right)$ with Marcum Q-function $Q_M(a,b)$
- Mean: $\sqrt{\frac{\pi}{2}}L_{1/2}^{(k/2-1)}\left(\frac{-\lambda^2}{2}\right)\,$
- Variance: $k+\lambda^2-\mu^2$, where $\mu$ is the mean

In probability theory and statistics, the noncentral chi distribution is a noncentral generalization of the chi distribution. It is also known as the generalized Rayleigh distribution.

== Definition ==
If $X_i$ are k independent, normally distributed random variables with means $\mu_i$ and variances $\sigma_i^2$, then the statistic

$$Z = \sqrt{\sum_{i=1}^k \left(\frac{X_i}{\sigma_i}\right)^2}$$

is distributed according to the noncentral chi distribution. The noncentral chi distribution has two parameters: $k$ which specifies the number of degrees of freedom (i.e. the number of $X_i$), and $\lambda$ which is related to the mean of the random variables $X_i$ by:

$$\lambda=\sqrt{\sum_{i=1}^k \left(\frac{\mu_i}{\sigma_i}\right)^2}$$

== Properties ==
=== Probability density function ===
The probability density function (pdf) is

$$f(x;k,\lambda)=\frac{e^{-(x^2+\lambda^2)/2}x^k\lambda}
{(\lambda x)^{k/2}} I_{k/2-1}(\lambda x)$$

where $I_\nu(z)$ is a modified Bessel function of the first kind.

=== Raw moments ===
The first few raw moments are:

$$\mu^'_1=\sqrt{\frac{\pi}{2}}L_{1/2}^{(k/2-1)}\left(\frac{-\lambda^2}{2}\right)$$
$$\mu^'_2=k+\lambda^2$$
$$\mu^'_3=3\sqrt{\frac{\pi}{2}}L_{3/2}^{(k/2-1)}\left(\frac{-\lambda^2}{2}\right)$$
$$\mu^'_4=(k+\lambda^2)^2+2(k+2\lambda^2)$$

where $L_n^{(a)}(z)$ is a Laguerre function. Note that the 2$n$th moment is the same as the $n$th moment of the noncentral chi-squared distribution with $\lambda$ being replaced by $\lambda^2$.

== Bivariate non-central chi distribution ==
Let $X_j = (X_{1j}, X_{2j}), j = 1, 2, \dots n$, be a set of n independent and identically distributed bivariate normal random vectors with marginal distributions $N(\mu_i,\sigma_i^2), i=1,2$, correlation $\rho$, and mean vector and covariance matrix

$$E(X_j)= \mu=(\mu_1, \mu_2)^T, \qquad
\Sigma =
\begin{bmatrix}
\sigma_{11} & \sigma_{12} \\
\sigma_{21} & \sigma_{22}
\end{bmatrix}
= \begin{bmatrix}
\sigma_1^2 & \rho \sigma_1 \sigma_2 \\
\rho \sigma_1 \sigma_2 & \sigma_2^2
\end{bmatrix},$$

with $\Sigma$ positive definite. Define

$$U = \left[ \sum_{j=1}^n \frac{X_{1j}^2}{\sigma_1^2} \right]^{1/2}, \qquad
V = \left[ \sum_{j=1}^n \frac{X_{2j}^2}{\sigma_2^2} \right]^{1/2}.$$

Then the joint distribution of U, V is central or noncentral bivariate chi distribution with n degrees of freedom. If either or both $\mu_1 \neq 0$ or $\mu_2 \neq 0$ the distribution is a noncentral bivariate chi distribution.

== Related distributions ==
- If $X$ is a random variable with the non-central chi distribution, the random variable $X^2$ will have the noncentral chi-squared distribution. Other related distributions may be seen there.
- If $X$ is chi distributed: $X \sim \chi_k$ then $X$ is also non-central chi distributed: $X \sim NC\chi_k(0)$. In other words, the chi distribution is a special case of the non-central chi distribution (i.e., with a non-centrality parameter of zero).
- A noncentral chi distribution with 2 degrees of freedom is equivalent to a Rice distribution with $\sigma=1$.
- If X follows a noncentral chi distribution with 1 degree of freedom and noncentrality parameter λ, then σX follows a folded normal distribution whose parameters are equal to σλ and σ^{2} for any value of σ.
