= Logarithmically concave measure =

In mathematics, a Borel measure μ on n-dimensional Euclidean space $\mathbb{R}^{n}$ is called logarithmically concave (or log-concave for short) if, for any compact subsets A and B of $\mathbb{R}^{n}$ and 0 < λ < 1, one has

$$\mu(\lambda A + (1-\lambda) B) \geq \mu(A)^\lambda \mu(B)^{1-\lambda},$$

where λ A + (1 − λ) B denotes the Minkowski sum of λ A and (1 − λ) B.

== Examples ==
The Brunn–Minkowski inequality asserts that the Lebesgue measure is log-concave. The restriction of the Lebesgue measure to any convex set is also log-concave.

By a theorem of Borell, a probability measure on R^d is log-concave if and only if it has a density with respect to the Lebesgue measure on some affine hyperplane, and this density is a logarithmically concave function. Thus, any Gaussian measure is log-concave.

The Prékopa–Leindler inequality shows that a convolution of log-concave measures is log-concave.

== See also ==
- Convex measure, a generalisation of this concept
- Logarithmically concave function
