= Chi distribution =

Probability distribution

chi
- Probability density function

- Cumulative distribution function
- Notation: $\chi(k)\;$ or $\chi_k\!$
- Parameters: $k>0\,$ (degrees of freedom)
- Support: $x\in [0,\infty)$
- PDF: $\frac{1}{2^{(k/2)-1}\Gamma(k/2)}\;x^{k-1}e^{-x^2/2}$
- CDF: $P(k/2,x^2/2)\,$
- Mean: $\mu=\sqrt{2}\,\frac{\Gamma((k+1)/2)}{\Gamma(k/2)}$
- Median: $\approx \sqrt{k\bigg(1-\frac{2}{9k}\bigg)^3}$
- Mode: $\sqrt{k-1}\,$ for $k\ge 1$
- Variance: $\sigma^2=k-\mu^2\,$
- Skewness: $\gamma_1=\frac{\mu}{\sigma^3}\,(1-2\sigma^2)$
- Excess kurtosis: $\frac{2}{\sigma^2}(1-\mu\sigma\gamma_1-\sigma^2)$
- Entropy: $\ln(\Gamma(k/2))+\,$ $\frac{1}{2}(k\!-\!\ln(2)\!-\!(k\!-\!1)\psi_0(k/2))$
- MGF: Complicated (see text)
- CF: Complicated (see text)

In probability theory and statistics, the chi distribution is a continuous probability distribution over the non-negative real line. It is the distribution of the positive square root of a sum of squared independent Gaussian random variables. Equivalently, it is the distribution of the Euclidean distance between a multivariate Gaussian random variable and the origin. The chi distribution describes the positive square roots of a variable obeying a chi-squared distribution.

If $Z_1, \ldots, Z_k$ are $k$ independent, normally distributed random variables with mean 0 and standard deviation 1, then the statistic

$$Y = \sqrt{\sum_{i=1}^k Z_i^2}$$

is distributed according to the chi distribution. The chi distribution has one positive integer parameter $k$, which specifies the degrees of freedom (i.e. the number of random variables $Z_i$).

The most familiar examples are the Rayleigh distribution (chi distribution with two degrees of freedom) and the Maxwell–Boltzmann distribution of the molecular speeds in an ideal gas (chi distribution with three degrees of freedom).

== Definitions ==
=== Probability density function ===
The probability density function (pdf) of the chi-distribution is

$$f(x;k) = \begin{cases}
\dfrac{x^{k-1}e^{-x^2/2}}{2^{k/2-1}\Gamma\left(\frac{k}{2}\right)}, & x\geq 0; \\ 0, & \text{otherwise}.
\end{cases}$$

where $\Gamma(z)$ is the gamma function.

=== Cumulative distribution function ===
The cumulative distribution function is given by:

$$F(x;k)=P(k/2,x^2/2)\,$$

where $P(k,x)$ is the regularized gamma function.

=== Generating functions ===
The moment-generating function is given by:

$$M(t)=M\left(\frac{k}{2},\frac{1}{2},\frac{t^2}{2}\right)+t\sqrt{2}\,\frac{\Gamma((k+1)/2)}{\Gamma(k/2)} M\left(\frac{k+1}{2},\frac{3}{2},\frac{t^2}{2}\right),$$

where $M(a,b,z)$ is Kummer's confluent hypergeometric function. The characteristic function is given by:

$$\varphi(t;k)=M\left(\frac{k}{2},\frac{1}{2},\frac{-t^2}{2}\right) + it\sqrt{2}\,\frac{\Gamma((k+1)/2)}{\Gamma(k/2)} M\left(\frac{k+1}{2},\frac{3}{2},\frac{-t^2}{2}\right).$$

== Properties ==
=== Moments ===
The raw moments are then given by:

$$\mu_j = \int_0^\infty f(x;k) x^j \mathrm{d} x = 2^{j/2}\ \frac{\ \Gamma\left( \tfrac{1}{2}(k+j) \right)\ }{\Gamma\left( \tfrac{1}{2}k \right)}$$

where $\ \Gamma(z)\$ is the gamma function. Thus the first few raw moments are:

$$\mu_1 = \sqrt{2\ }\ \frac{\ \Gamma\left( \tfrac{1}{2}(k + 1) \right)\ }{\Gamma\left( \tfrac{1}{2}k \right)}$$
$$\mu_2 = k\ ,$$
$$\mu_3=2\sqrt{2\ }\ \frac{\ \Gamma\left( \tfrac{1}{2}(k + 3) \right)\ }{\Gamma\left( \tfrac{1}{2}k \right)} = (k+1)\ \mu_1\ ,$$
$$\mu_4 = (k)(k+2)\ ,$$
$$\mu_5 = 4\sqrt{2\ }\ \frac{\ \Gamma\left( \tfrac{1}{2}(k\!+\!5) \right)\ }{\Gamma\left( \tfrac{1}{2}k \right)} = (k+1)(k+3)\ \mu_1\ ,$$
$$\mu_6 = (k)(k+2)(k+4)\ ,$$

where the rightmost expressions are derived using the recurrence relationship for the gamma function:

$$\Gamma(x+1) = x\ \Gamma(x) ~.$$

From these expressions we may derive the following relationships:

Mean: $\mu = \sqrt{2\ }\ \frac{\ \Gamma\left( \tfrac{1}{2}(k+1) \right)\ }{\Gamma\left( \tfrac{1}{2} k \right)}\ ,$ which is close to $\sqrt{k - \tfrac{1}{2}\ }\$ for large k.

Variance: $V = k - \mu^2\ ,$ which approaches $\ \tfrac{1}{2}\$ as k increases.

Skewness: $\gamma_1 = \frac{\mu}{\ \sigma^3\ } \left(1 - 2 \sigma^2 \right) ~.$

Kurtosis excess: $\gamma_2 = \frac{2}{\ \sigma^2\ } \left(1 - \mu\ \sigma\ \gamma_1 - \sigma^2 \right) ~.$

=== Entropy ===
The entropy is given by:

$$S=\ln(\Gamma(k/2))+\frac{1}{2}(k\!-\!\ln(2)\!-\!(k\!-\!1)\psi^0(k/2))$$

where $\psi^0(z)$ is the polygamma function.

=== Large n approximation ===
We find the large n=k+1 approximation of the mean and variance of chi distribution. This has application e.g. in finding the distribution of standard deviation of a sample of normally distributed population, where n is the sample size.

The mean is then:

$$\mu = \sqrt{2}\,\,\frac{\Gamma(n/2)}{\Gamma((n-1)/2)}$$

We use the Legendre duplication formula to write:

$$2^{n-2} \,\Gamma((n-1)/2)\cdot \Gamma(n/2) = \sqrt{\pi} \Gamma (n-1)$$,

so that:

$$\mu = \sqrt{2/\pi}\,2^{n-2}\,\frac{(\Gamma(n/2))^2}{\Gamma(n-1)}$$

Using Stirling's approximation for Gamma function, we get the following expression for the mean:

$\mu = \sqrt{2/\pi}\,2^{n-2}\,\frac{\left(\sqrt{2\pi}(n/2-1)^{n/2-1+1/2}e^{-(n/2-1)}\cdot[1+\frac{1}{12(n/2-1)}+O(\frac{1}{n^2})]\right)^2}{\sqrt{2\pi}(n-2)^{n-2+1/2}e^{-(n-2)}\cdot [1+\frac{1}{12(n-2)}+O(\frac{1}{n^2})]}$

$$= (n-2)^{1/2}\,\cdot \left[1+\frac{1}{4n}+O(\frac{1}{n^2})\right] = \sqrt{n-1}\,(1-\frac{1}{n-1})^{1/2}\cdot \left[1+\frac{1}{4n}+O(\frac{1}{n^2})\right]$$
$$= \sqrt{n-1}\,\cdot \left[1-\frac{1}{2n}+O(\frac{1}{n^2})\right]\,\cdot \left[1+\frac{1}{4n}+O(\frac{1}{n^2})\right]$$
$$= \sqrt{n-1}\,\cdot \left[1-\frac{1}{4n}+O(\frac{1}{n^2})\right]$$

And thus the variance is:

$$V=(n-1)-\mu^2\, = (n-1)\cdot \frac{1}{2n}\,\cdot \left[1+O(\frac{1}{n})\right] = \frac12 + O(\frac1n)$$

== Related distributions ==
- If $X \sim \chi_k$ then $X^2 \sim \chi^2_k$ (chi-squared distribution)
- $\chi_1 \sim \mathrm{HN}(1)\,$ (half-normal distribution), i.e. if $X \sim N(0,1)\,$ then $| X | \sim \chi_1 \,$, and if $Y \sim \mathrm{HN}(\sigma)\,$ for any $\sigma > 0 \,$ then $\tfrac{Y}{\sigma} \sim \chi_1\,$
- $\chi_2 \sim \mathrm{Rayleigh}(1)\,$ (Rayleigh distribution) and if $Y \sim \mathrm{Rayleigh}(\sigma)\,$ for any $\sigma > 0 \,$ then $\tfrac{Y}{\sigma} \sim \chi_2\,$
- $\chi_3 \sim \mathrm{Maxwell}(1)\,$ (Maxwell distribution) and if $Y \sim \mathrm{Maxwell}(a)\,$ for any $a > 0 \,$ then $\tfrac{Y}{a} \sim \chi_3\,$
- $\|\boldsymbol{N}_{i=1,\ldots,k}{(0,1)}\|_2 \sim \chi_k$, the Euclidean norm of a standard normal random vector of with $k$ dimensions, is distributed according to a chi distribution with $k$ degrees of freedom
- chi distribution is a special case of various distributions: generalized gamma, Nakagami, noncentral chi, etc.
- $\lim_{k \to \infty}\tfrac{\chi_k-\mu_k}{\sigma_k} \xrightarrow{d}\ N(0,1) \,$ (Normal distribution)
- The mean of the chi distribution (scaled by the square root of $n-1$) yields the correction factor in the unbiased estimation of the standard deviation of the normal distribution.

Various chi and chi-squared distributions
Name	Statistic
chi-squared distribution	$\sum_{i=1}^k \left(\frac{X_i-\mu_i}{\sigma_i}\right)^2$
noncentral chi-squared distribution	$\sum_{i=1}^k \left(\frac{X_i}{\sigma_i}\right)^2$
chi distribution	$\sqrt{\sum_{i=1}^k \left(\frac{X_i-\mu_i}{\sigma_i}\right)^2}$
noncentral chi distribution	$\sqrt{\sum_{i=1}^k \left(\frac{X_i}{\sigma_i}\right)^2}$
